= Freiburg im Breisgau =

City in Baden-Württemberg, Germany

Freiburg im Breisgau Friburg im Brisgau (Alemannic German)
- City
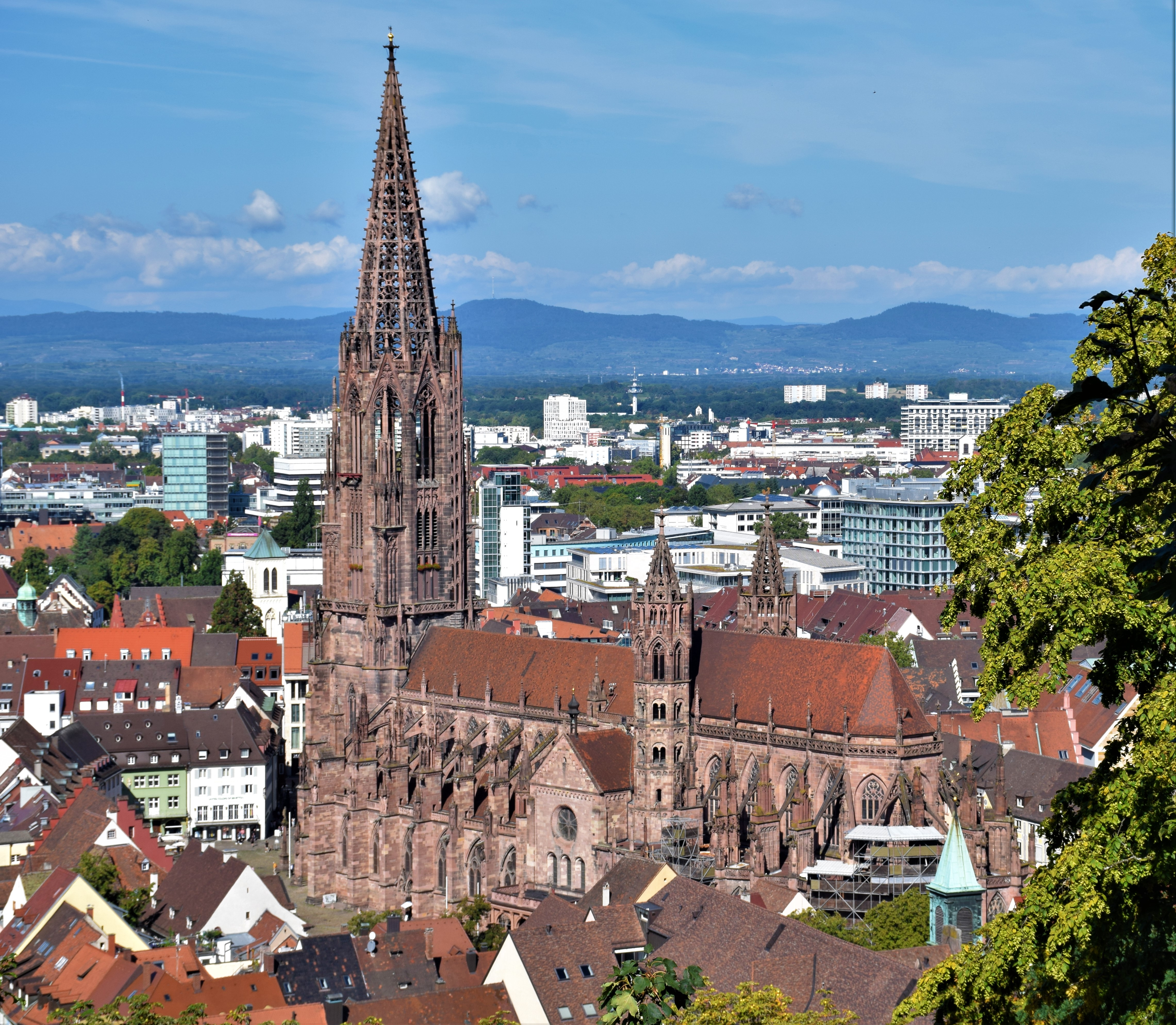
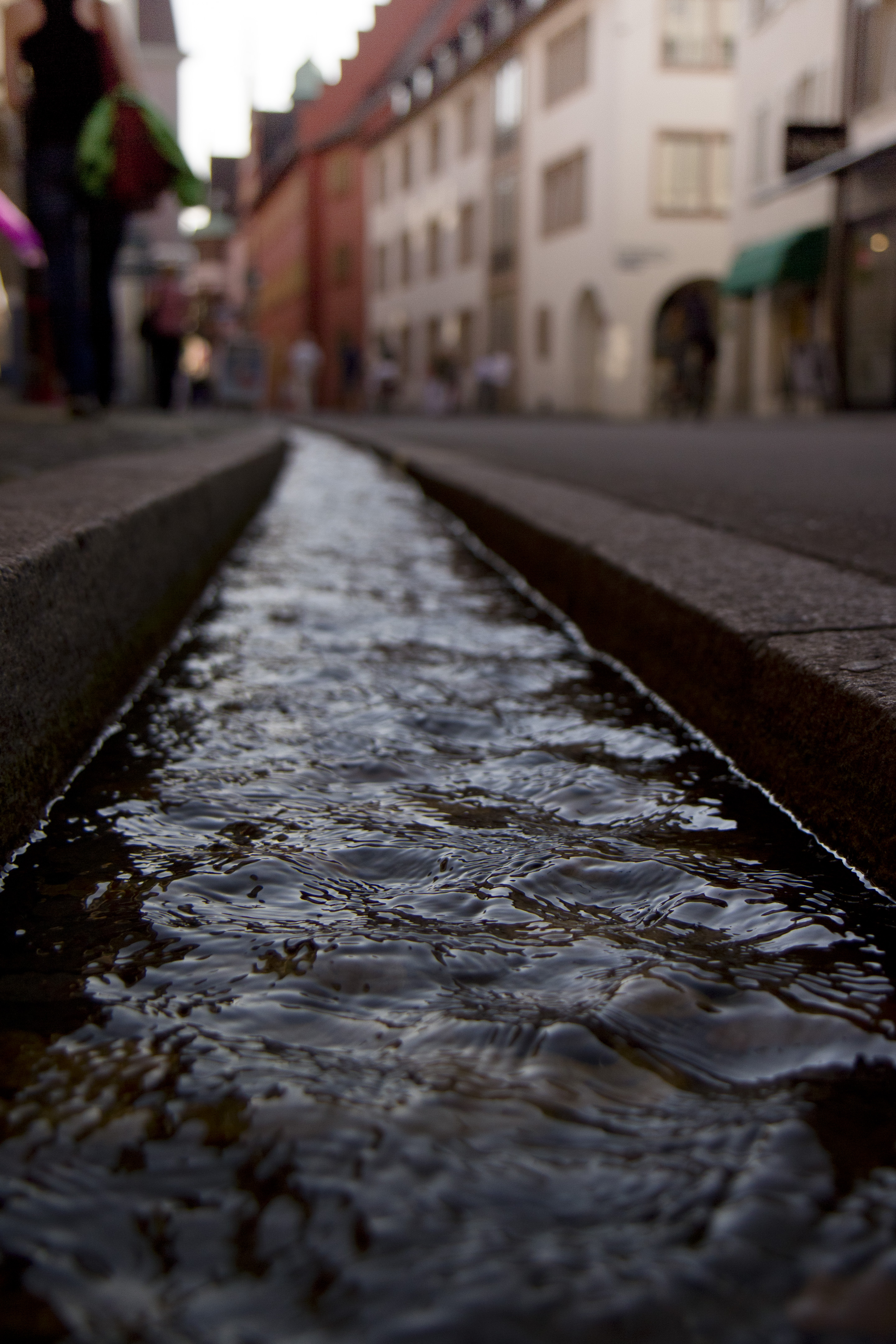
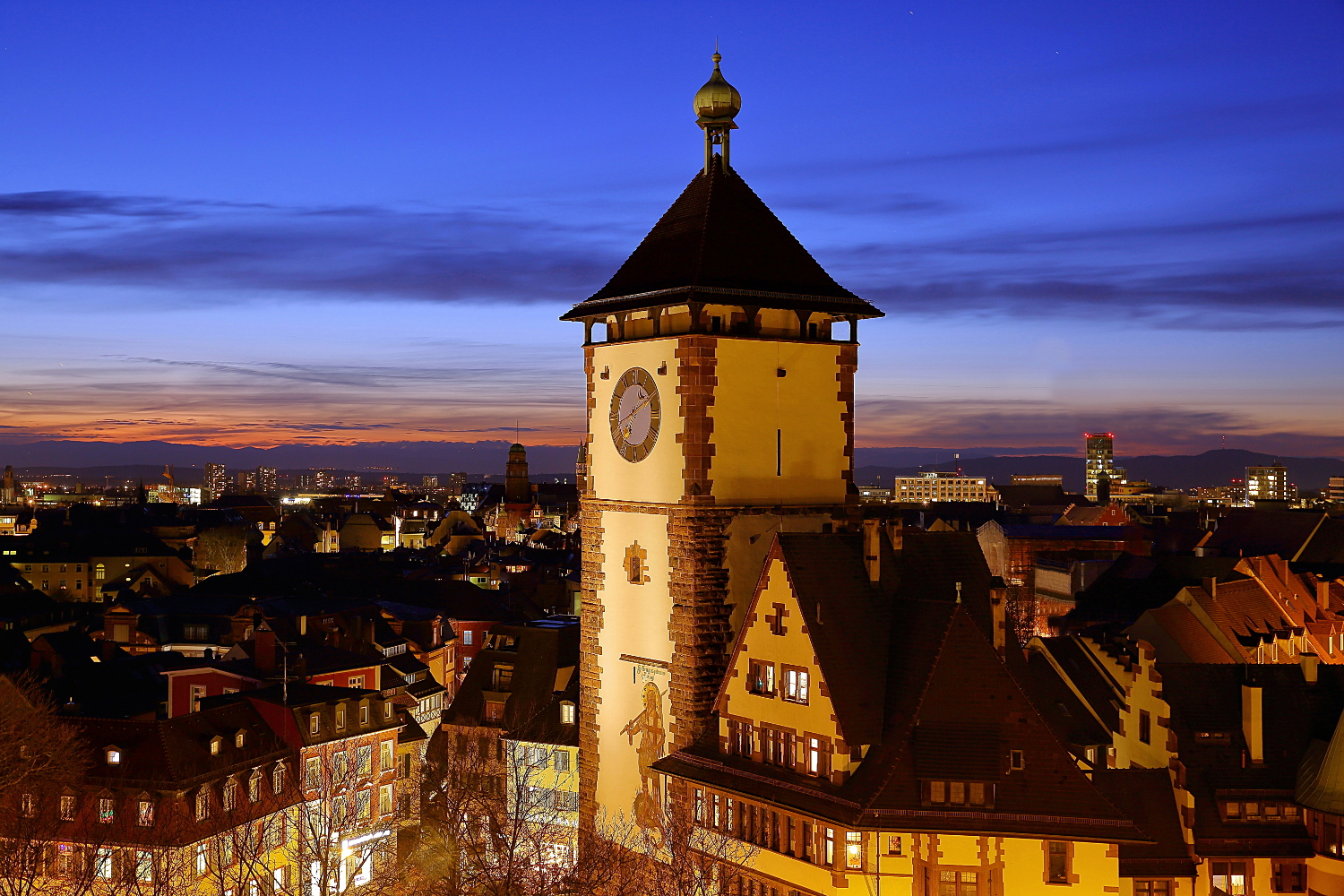
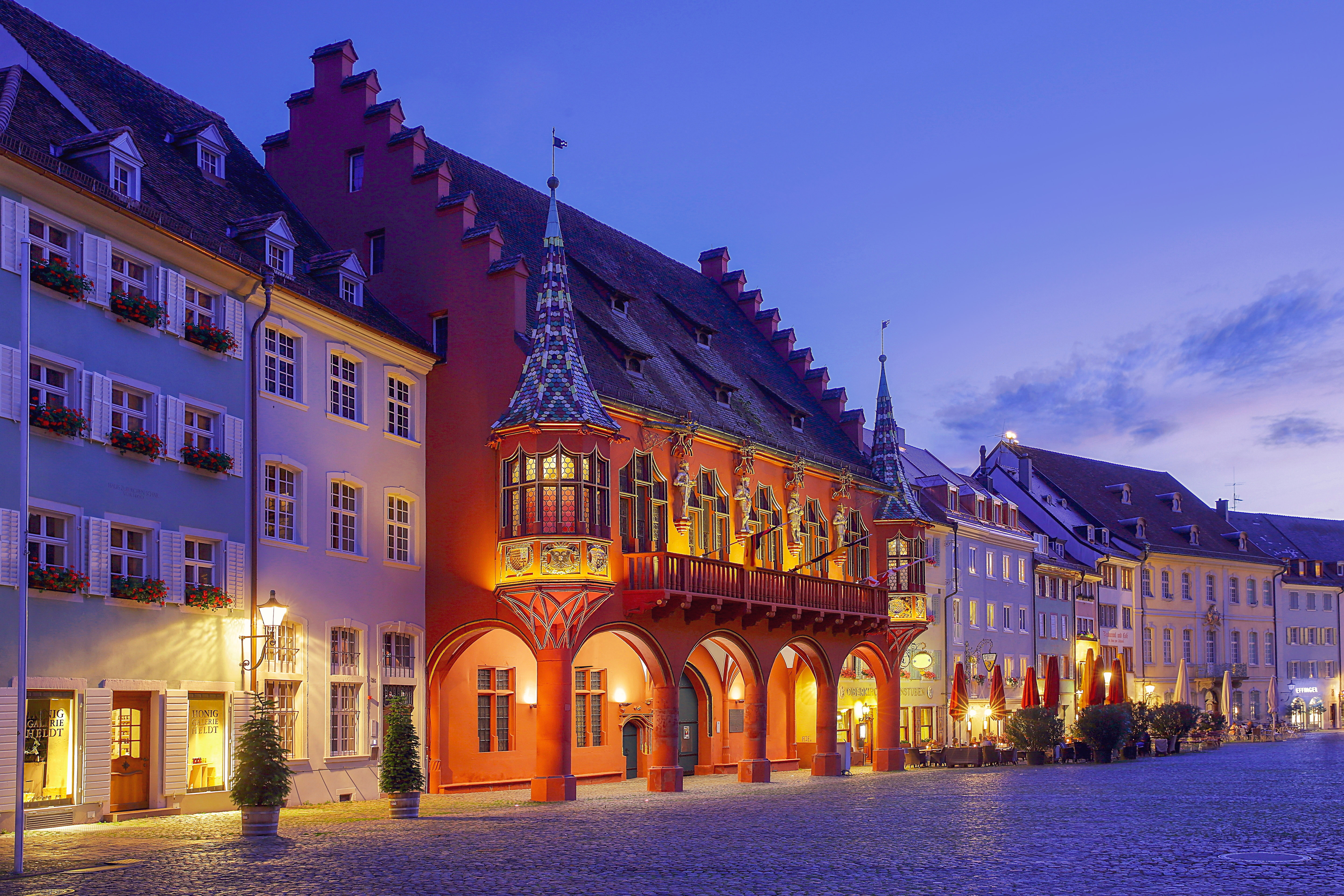
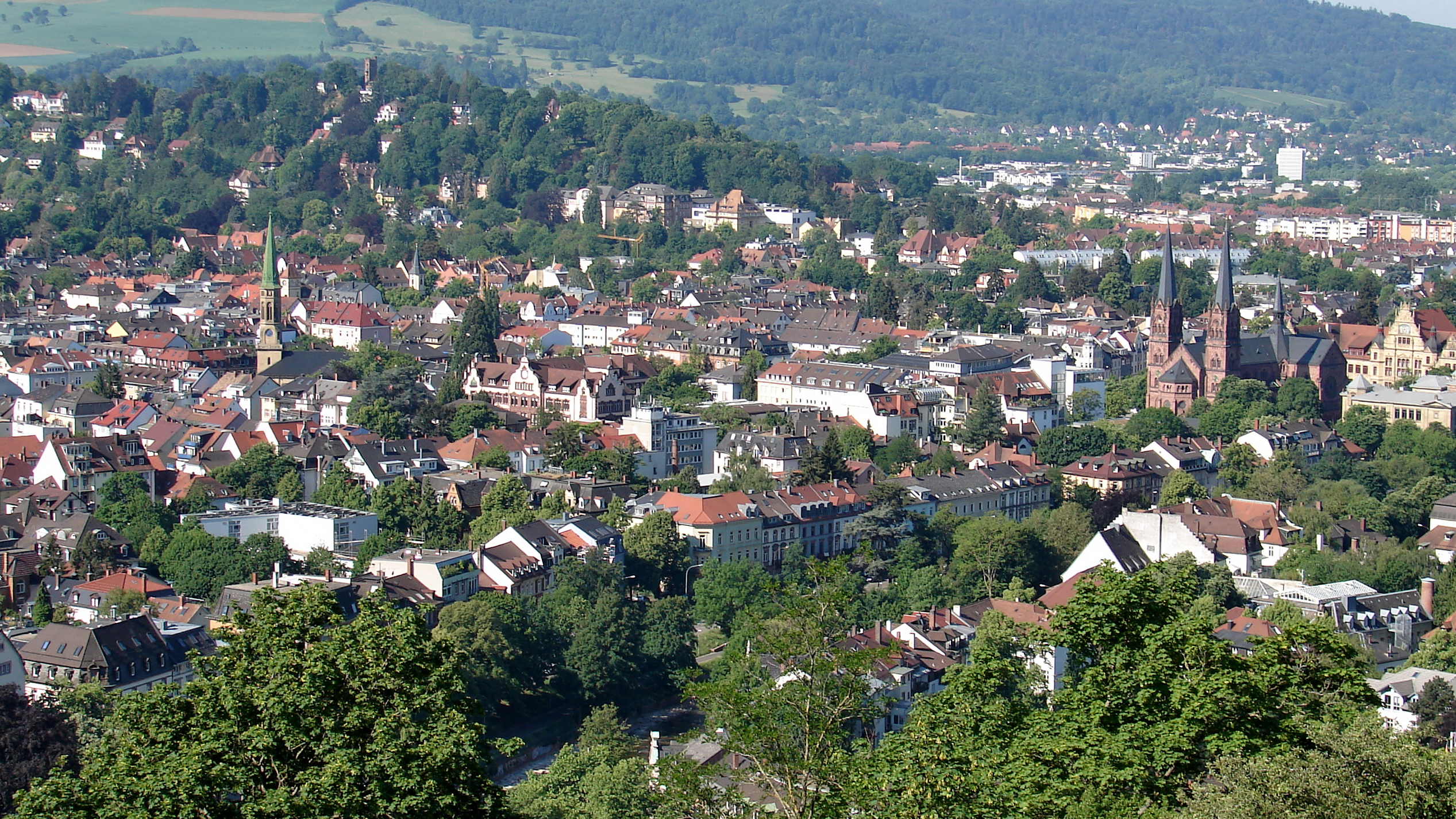
- Freiburg Minster Bächle Swabian Gate Historical Merchants' Hall Aerial view from Schlossberg

- Flag Coat of arms
- Interactive map of Freiburg im Breisgau
- Location within Germany Location within Baden-Württemberg
- Coordinates: 47°59′42″N 07°51′00″E
- Country: Germany
- State: Baden-Württemberg
- Admin. region: Freiburg
- District: Stadtkreis
- Subdivisions: 41 districts

Government
  - Mayor (2018–26): Martin Horn (Ind.)

Area
  - City: 153.04 km^{2} (59.09 sq mi)
- Elevation: 278 m (912 ft)

Population (2025-12-31)
  - City: 238,299
  - Density: 1,557.1/km^{2} (4,032.9/sq mi)
  - Urban: 354,500
  - Metro: 656,753 Oberrhein
- Time zone: UTC+01:00 (CET)
  - Summer (DST): UTC+02:00 (CEST)
- Postal codes: 79098–79117
- Dialling codes: 0761, 07664, 07665
- Vehicle registration: FR
- Website: www.freiburg.de

Freiburg im Breisgau, (Note: English: /ˈfraɪbʊərk ɪm ˈbraɪsɡaʊ/ FRY-boork im BRYSSE-gow; German: [ˈfʁaɪbʊʁk ʔɪm ˈbʁaɪsɡaʊ]; Alemannic German: Friburg im Brisgau or simply Friburg [ˈfʁiːb̥əɡ̊]; French: Fribourg-en-Brisgau; all literally 'Freiburg in the Breisgau'.) usually shortened to Freiburg, is the fourth-largest city in the German state of Baden-Württemberg after Stuttgart, Mannheim and Karlsruhe. Its built-up area has a population of about 355,000 (2021), while the greater Freiburg metropolitan area (Einzugsgebiet) has about 660,000 (2018).

Freiburg is located at the southwestern foothills of the Black Forest, on the Dreisam River, a tributary of the Elz. It is Germany's southwestern- and southernmost city with a population exceeding 100,000. It lies in the Breisgau, one of Germany's warmest regions, in the south of the Upper Rhine Plain. Its city limits reach from the Schauinsland summit (1,284 metres (4,213 ft)) in the Black Forest to 3 kilometres (1.9 mi) east of the French border, while Switzerland is 42 kilometres (26 mi) to the south. The city is situated in the major wine-growing region of Baden and, together with Offenburg, serves as a tourist entry-point to the scenic Black Forest. According to meteorological statistics, Freiburg held the all-time German temperature record of 40.2 °C (104.4 °F) from 2003 to 2015.

An old university town and archiepiscopal seat, it was incorporated in the early 12th century and soon became a commercial, intellectual and ecclesiastical center for the Upper Rhine region. The University of Freiburg (Albert-Ludwigs-Universität Freiburg), founded in 1457, is one of Germany's oldest universities. Freiburg's main landmark is the Freiburg Minster (Freiburger Münster), which was built between c. 1200 and 1513 and has been described as "Gothic architectural masterpiece".

The old town is traversed by an extensive system of runnels called Bächle (lit. 'small streams'), that are fed with water from the Dreisam and run on the side of almost all streets and alleys, giving the city a unique touch. Freiburg has a high standard of living, and is known for its advanced environmental practices, which is embodied by local housing projects such as the creation of the sustainable district of Vauban.

The dialect spoken in Freiburg is classified as (Upper Rhenish) Low Alemannic, and therefore most closely related to the other dialects of Baden north of Markgräflerland and south of Karlsruhe, to most dialects historically spoken in Alsace (Alsatian), and to Basel German.

== History ==
Freiburg was founded by Konrad and Duke Berthold III of the House of Zähringen in 1120 as a free market town; hence its name, which translates to "free (or independent) town". Frei means "free", and Burg, like the modern English word "borough", was used in those days for an incorporated city or town, usually one with some degree of autonomy. The German word Burg also means "a fortified town", as in Hamburg. Thus, it is likely that the name of this place means a "fortified town of free citizens".

This town was strategically located at a junction of trade routes between the Mediterranean Sea and the North Sea regions, and the Rhine and Danube rivers. In 1200, Freiburg's population numbered approximately 6,000 people. At about that time, under the rule of Bertold V, the last duke of Zähringen, the town began construction of its Freiburg Minster on the site of an older parish church. Begun in the Romanesque style, it was continued and completed 1513 for the most part as a Gothic edifice. In 1218, when Bertold V died, then Egino V von Urach, the count of Urach assumed the title of Freiburg's count as Egino I von Freiburg. The town council did not trust the new nobles and wrote down its established rights in a document. At the end of the thirteenth century there was a feud between the town of Freiburg and their lord, Count Egino II of Freiburg. Egino II raised taxes and sought to limit the citizens' freedom, after which the Freiburgers used catapults to destroy the count's castle atop the Schloßberg, a hill that overlooks the town. The furious count called on his brother-in-law the Prince-Bishop of Strasbourg, Conrad of Lichtenberg, for help. The bishop responded by marching with his army to Freiburg.

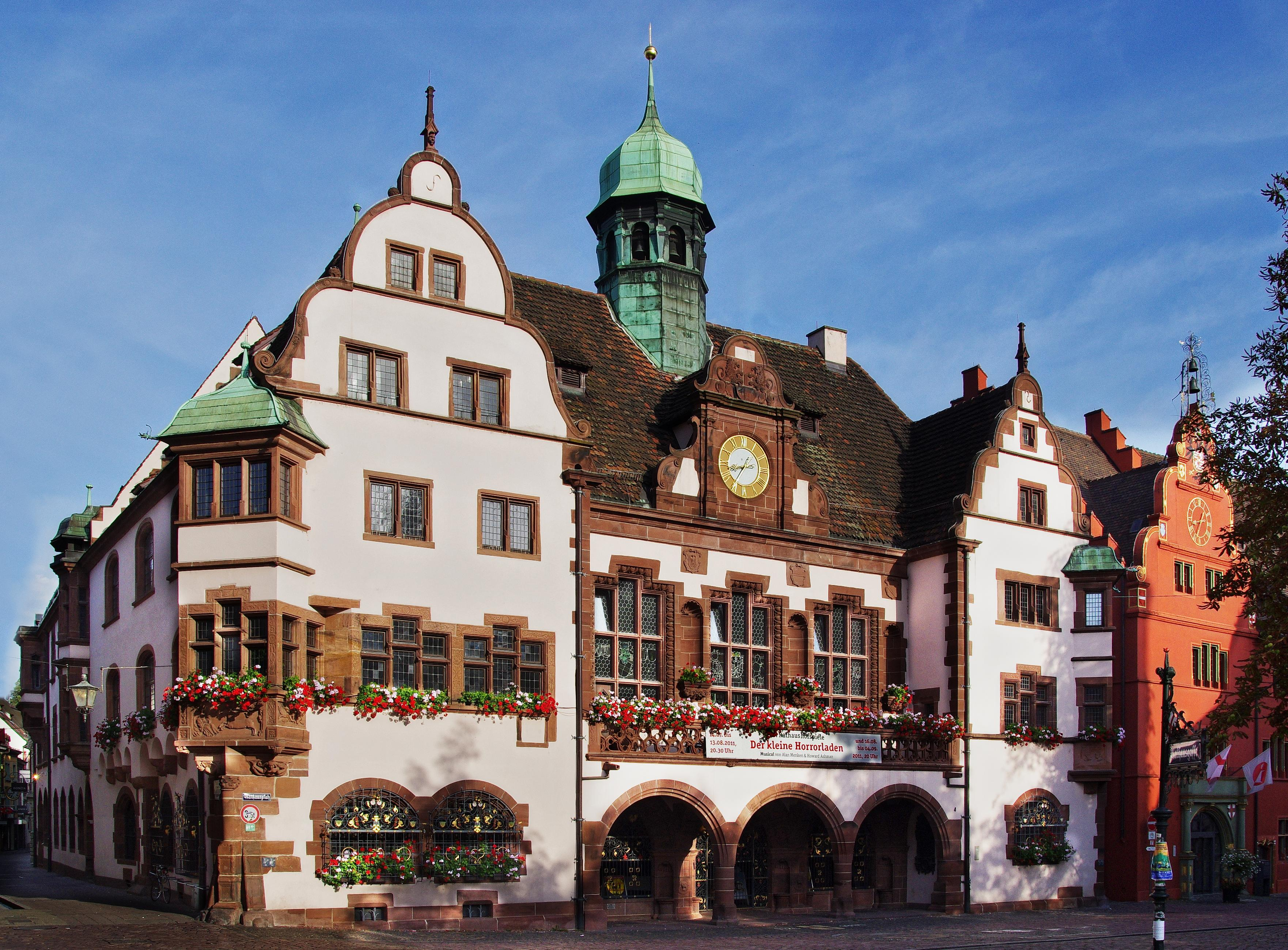
Freiburg im Breisgau Town Hall (Rathaus)

According to an old Freiburg legend, a butcher named Hauri stabbed the Bishop of Strasbourg to death on 29 July 1299. It was a Pyrrhic victory, since henceforth the citizens of Freiburg had to pay an annual expiation of 300 marks in silver to the count of Freiburg until 1368. In 1366 the counts of Freiburg made another failed attempt to occupy the town during a night raid. Eventually the inhabitants were fed up with their lords, and in 1368 Freiburg purchased its independence from them. The town turned itself over to the protection of the Habsburgs, who allowed the town to retain a large measure of freedom. Most of the nobles of the city died in the battle of Sempach (1386). The patrician family Schnewlin took control of the city until the guildsmen revolted. The guilds became more powerful than the patricians by 1389.

The silver mines in Mount Schauinsland provided an important source of capital for Freiburg. This silver made Freiburg one of the richest cities in Europe, and in 1327 Freiburg minted its own coin, the Rappenpfennig. In 1377 the cities of Freiburg, Basel, Colmar, and Breisach entered into a monetary alliance known as the Genossenschaft des Rappenpfennigs (Rappenpfennig Collective). This alliance facilitated commerce among the cities and lasted until the end of the sixteenth century. There were 8,000–9,000 people living in Freiburg between the thirteenth and fourteenth centuries, and 30 churches and monasteries. At the end of the fourteenth century the veins of silver were dwindling, and by 1460 only approximately 6,000 people still lived within Freiburg's city walls.

A university town, Freiburg evolved from its focus on mining to become a cultural centre for the arts and sciences. It was also a commercial center. The end of the Middle Ages and the dawn of the Renaissance was a time of both advances and tragedy for Freiburg.

In 1457, Albrecht VI, Regent of Further Austria, established Albert-Ludwigs-Universität, one of Germany's oldest universities. In 1498, Emperor Maximilian I held a Reichstag in Freiburg. In 1520, the town ratified a set of legal reforms, widely considered the most progressive of the time. The aim was to find a balance between traditions and old Roman Law. The reforms were well received, especially the sections dealing with civil process law, punishment, and the town's constitution.

In 1520, Freiburg decided not to take part in the Reformation and became an important centre for Catholicism on the Upper Rhine. Erasmus moved here after Basel accepted the Reformation. In 1536, a strong and persistent belief in witchcraft led to the town's first witch-hunt. The need to find a scapegoat for calamities such as the Black Plague, which claimed 2,000 area residents (25% of the town's population) in 1564, led to an escalation in witch-hunting that peaked in 1599. A plaque on the old town wall marks the spot where burnings were carried out.

The seventeenth, eighteenth, and nineteenth centuries were turbulent times for Freiburg. At the beginning of the Thirty Years' War in 1618, its population numbered between 10,000 and 14,000; when it ended in 1648, only 2,000 remained. In August 1644, it was the site of the Battle of Freiburg, said to be the bloodiest battle of the war in terms of percentage of casualties.

Between 1648 and 1805, when the town was not under French occupation, it was the administrative headquarters of Further Austria, the Habsburg territories in southwest Germany. In 1805 the town, together with the Breisgau and Ortenau areas, became part of Baden. In 1828, after the Archdiocese of Freiburg was founded, Freiburg became seat of a Catholic archbishop.

Timeline of Freiburg im Breisgau
| ← / Founded by Duke Bertold III of Zähringen; ← / Inherited by the Counts of Urach; ← / Purchased its independence; ← / Became part of Baden; ← / Heavily damaged during WWII |

Freiburg was heavily bombed during World War II. In May 1940, aircraft of the Luftwaffe mistakenly dropped approximately 60 bombs on Freiburg near the railway station, killing 57 people, most of them civilians and including 22 children. This was reported by the official German news agency as an attack by the Western Allies, and retaliation against them was threatened. The Freiburg police commander subsequently established that the bombs were German, but the full story was not published until many years later. On 27 November 1944, a raid by more than 300 bombers of RAF Bomber Command (Operation Tigerfish) destroyed a large portion of the city centre, with the notable exception of the Münster—which was only lightly damaged—and houses southeast of it. After the war, the city was rebuilt on its medieval plan.

On 22 October 1940, the Nazi Gauleiter of Baden, Robert Heinrich Wagner, ordered the deportation of all of Baden's and 350 of Freiburg's Jewish population. They were deported to Camp Gurs in the south of France, where many died. On 18 July 1942, the remaining Baden and Freiburg Jews were transferred to Auschwitz in German-occupied Poland, where almost all were murdered. A memorial has been created in the form of the 'footprint' in marble on the site of the city's original synagogue, which was burned down on 9 November 1938, during the pogrom known as Kristallnacht. The memorial is a fountain and contains a bronze plaque commemorating the original building and the Jewish community which perished. The pavements of Freiburg carry memorials to individual victims, in the form of brass plates outside their former residences. There was a camp for Sinti and Romani people (see Romani Holocaust) in the city.

It was occupied by the French Army on 21 April 1945, and Freiburg was soon allotted to the French Zone of Occupation. In December 1945 Freiburg became the seat of government for the German state of Baden, which was merged into Baden-Württemberg in 1952. The French Army maintained a presence in Freiburg until 1991, when the last French Army division left the city, and left Germany.

The Union for Aromanian Language and Culture, an Aromanian cultural organization, was founded in 1985 in Freiburg by the Aromanian professor Vasile Barba.

On the site of the former French Army base, a new neighborhood for 5,000 people, Vauban, began in the late 1990s as a "sustainable model district". Solar power provides electricity to many of the households in this small community.

== Points of interest ==
Because of its scenery, relatively warm and sunny climate, and easy access to the Black Forest, Freiburg is a hub for regional tourism. In 2010, Freiburg was voted as the Academy of Urbanism's European City of the Year in recognition of the exemplary sustainable urbanism it had implemented over the preceding decades.

The longest cable car run in Germany, which is 3.6 kilometres (2.2 mi) long, runs from Günterstal up to a nearby mountain called Schauinsland.

The city has an unusual system of gutters (called Freiburg Bächle) that run throughout its centre. These Bächle, once used to provide water to fight fires and feed livestock, are constantly flowing with water diverted from the Dreisam. They were never intended to be used for sewage, and even in the Middle Ages such use could lead to harsh penalties. During the summer, the running water provides natural cooling of the air, and offers a pleasant gurgling sound. It is said that if one accidentally falls or steps into a Bächle, they will marry a Freiburger, or 'Bobbele'.

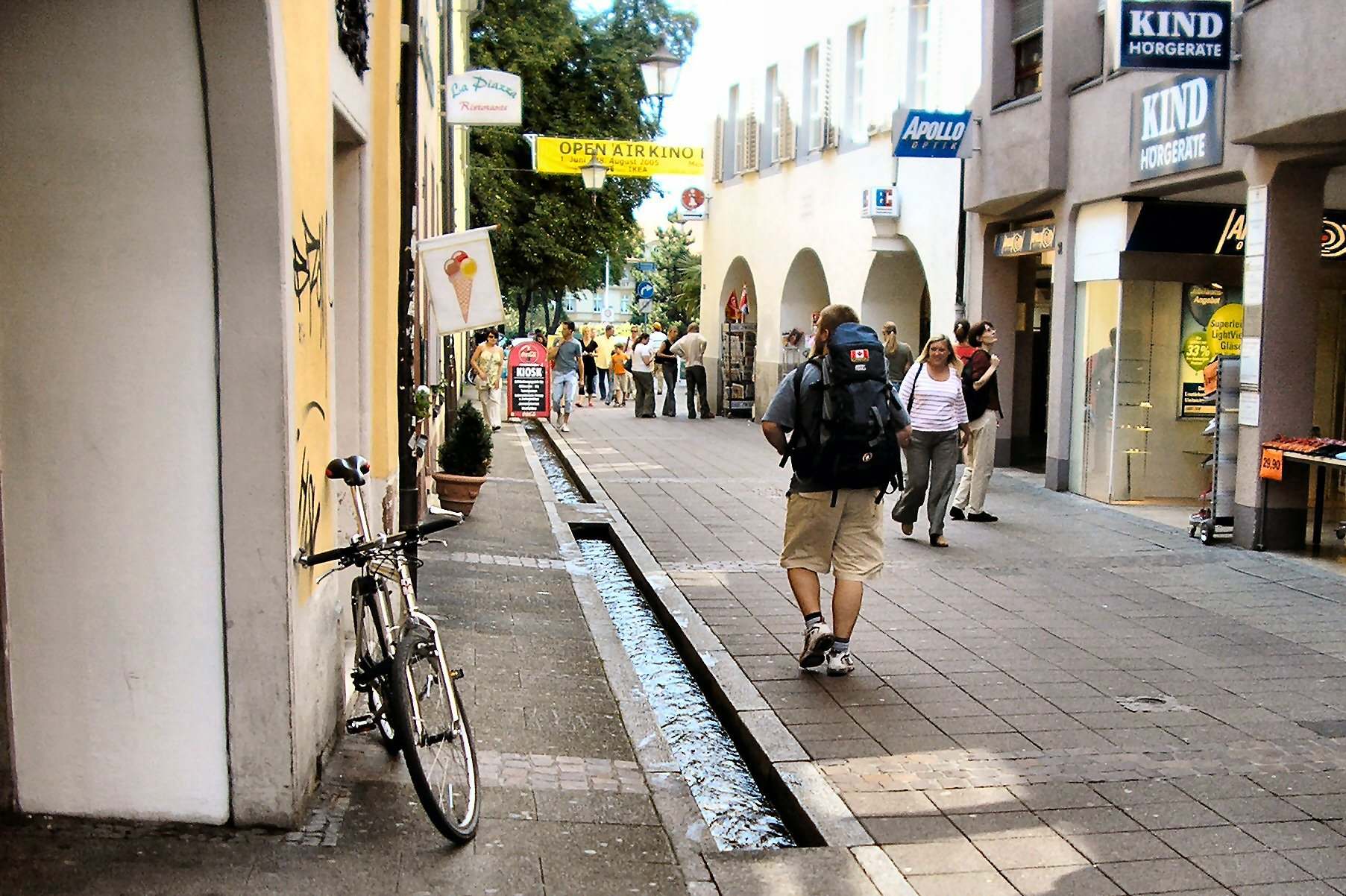
Bächle

The Augustinerplatz is one of the central squares in the old city. Formerly the location of an Augustinian monastery that became the Augustiner Museum in 1921, it is now a popular social space for Freiburg's younger residents. It has a number of restaurants and bars, including the local brewery 'Feierling', which has a Biergarten. On warm summer nights, hundreds of students gather here.

At the centre of the old city is the Münsterplatz or Cathedral Square, Freiburg's largest square. A farmers' market is held here every day except Sundays. This is the site of Freiburg's Münster, a gothic minster cathedral constructed of red sandstone, built between 1200 and 1530 and noted for its towering spire.

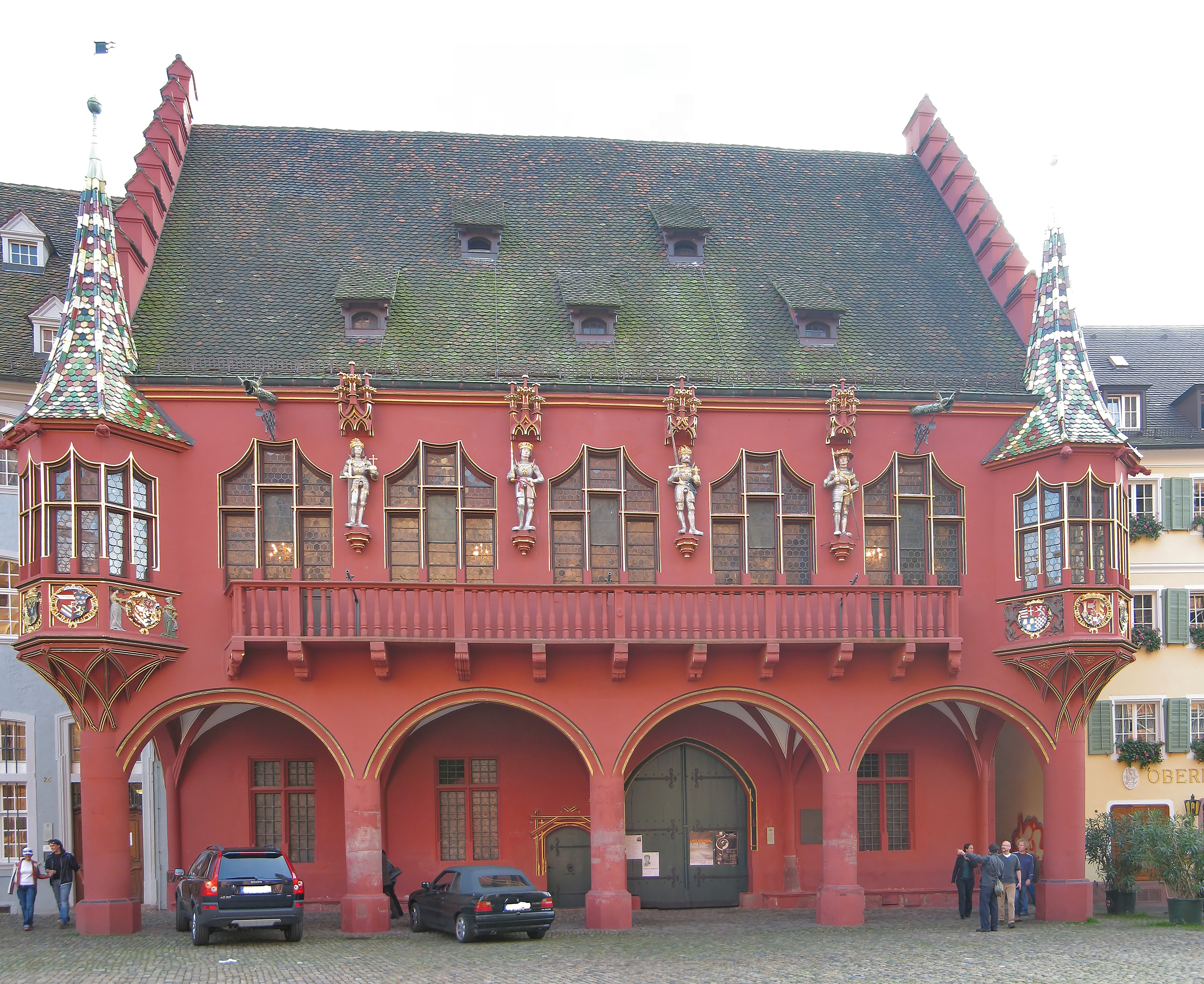
The Historical Merchants' Hall of 1520–21

The Historical Merchants' Hall (Historisches Kaufhaus), is a Late Gothic building on the south side of Freiburg's Münsterplatz. Built between 1520 and 1530, it was once the center of the financial life of the region. Its façade is decorated with statues and the coat of arms of four Habsburg emperors.

The Altes Rathaus, or old city hall, was completed in 1559 and has a painted façade. The Platz der alten Synagoge "Old Synagogue Square" is one of the more important squares on the outskirts of the historic old city. The square was the location of a synagogue until it was destroyed on Kristallnacht in 1938. Zum Roten Bären, the oldest hotel in Germany, is located along Oberlinden near the Swabian Gate.

The Siegesdenkmal, or victory monument, is a monument to the German victory in the Franco-Prussian War in 1871. It is situated at the northern edge of the historic city center of Freiburg and was built by Karl Friedrich Moest. In everyday language of people living in Freiburg, it serves as an orientation marker or as a meeting place.

To the east of the city centre, the Schlossberg hill provides extensive views over the city and surrounding region. The castle (Schloss) from which the hill takes its name was demolished in the 1740s, and only ruins remain. Schlossberg retained its importance to the city, however, and 150 years ago the city leaders opened up walks and views to make the mountain available to the public. Today, the Schlossbergbahn funicular railway connects the city centre to the hill.

Other museums in the city include the Archaeology Colombischlössle Museum.

=== List of popular sights ===
- Arboretum Freiburg-Günterstal, an arboretum in the suburb of Günterstal
- Freiburg Botanic Garden
- University of Freiburg
- University Library Freiburg, the newly renovated library features a modern design
- The Whale House, which, in Dario Argento's 1977 horror film Suspiria, served as the Dance Academy, the film's central location
- Augustiner Museum
- Freiburg Minster
- Schauinsland
- Schlossberg
- Colombischlössle Archeological Museum
- Green spaces
- Vauban, Freiburg, a sustainable eco-community
- Cobblestone mosaics
- Castle Kybfelsen

== Geography ==
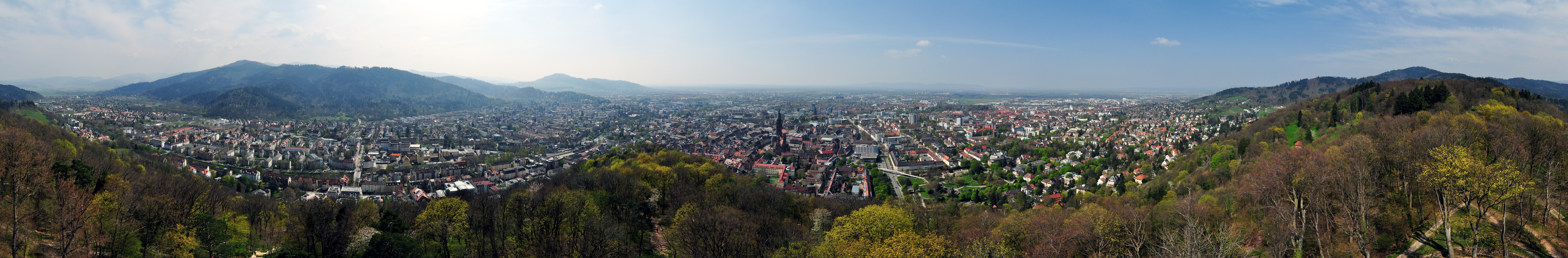
Panoramic view of Freiburg, seen from Schlossberg. Freiburg Münster can be seen just right of centre.

Freiburg is bordered by the Black Forest mountains Rosskopf and Bromberg to the east, Schönberg and Tuniberg to the south, with the Kaiserstuhl hill region to the west.

=== Climate ===
The Köppen climate classification classifies Freiburg's climate as temperate oceanic climate (Köppen: Cfb; Trewartha: Dobk). Thus, July and August are, along with Karlsruhe, the warmest within Germany. Winters are moderate but usually with some frosts at night. More year-round rain occurs here than in the Rhine plateau. The city is close to the Kaiserstuhl, a range of hills of volcanic origin located a few kilometers away, which is one of the warmest places in Germany and therefore considered as a viticultural area.

The Freiburg im Breisgau weather station has recorded the following extreme values:

- Highest Temperature 40.2 °C (104.4 °F) on 13 August 2003.
- Warmest Minimum 26.0 °C (78.8 °F) on 5 July 1957.
- Coldest Maximum −13.0 °C (8.6 °F) on 2 February 1956.
- Lowest Temperature −21.6 °C (−6.9 °F) on 10 February 1956.
- Highest Daily Precipitation 80.3 mm (3.16 in) on 18 May 1994.
- Wettest Month 288.9 mm (11.37 in) in August 1963.
- Wettest Year 1,224.8 mm (48.22 in) in 1965.
- Driest Year 641.0 mm (25.24 in) in 1953.
- Earliest Snowfall: 20 October 1905.
- Latest Snowfall: 28 April 1985.
- Longest annual sunshine: 2,129.4 hours in 2003.
- Shortest annual sunshine: 1,457.8 hours in 1980.

Climate data for Freiburg (1991–2020 normals, extremes 1874–present)
| Month | Jan | Feb | Mar | Apr | May | Jun | Jul | Aug | Sep | Oct | Nov | Dec | Year |
|---|---|---|---|---|---|---|---|---|---|---|---|---|---|
| Record high °C (°F) | 19.5 (67.1) | 21.9 (71.4) | 26.2 (79.2) | 29.8 (85.6) | 33.7 (92.7) | 36.5 (97.7) | 38.3 (100.9) | 40.2 (104.4) | 33.9 (93.0) | 30.8 (87.4) | 23.2 (73.8) | 21.7 (71.1) | 40.2 (104.4) |
| Mean maximum °C (°F) | 14.5 (58.1) | 15.9 (60.6) | 20.6 (69.1) | 25.6 (78.1) | 29.2 (84.6) | 32.6 (90.7) | 34.3 (93.7) | 33.7 (92.7) | 28.4 (83.1) | 24.2 (75.6) | 18.4 (65.1) | 14.8 (58.6) | 35.5 (95.9) |
| Mean daily maximum °C (°F) | 5.6 (42.1) | 8.1 (46.6) | 12.3 (54.1) | 16.7 (62.1) | 20.7 (69.3) | 24.8 (76.6) | 26.4 (79.5) | 26.1 (79.0) | 21.6 (70.9) | 16.5 (61.7) | 9.8 (49.6) | 6.5 (43.7) | 16.2 (61.2) |
| Daily mean °C (°F) | 2.9 (37.2) | 4.6 (40.3) | 7.6 (45.7) | 11.2 (52.2) | 15.3 (59.5) | 19.2 (66.6) | 20.8 (69.4) | 20.5 (68.9) | 16.4 (61.5) | 12.3 (54.1) | 6.8 (44.2) | 3.9 (39.0) | 11.8 (53.2) |
| Mean daily minimum °C (°F) | 0.2 (32.4) | 1.1 (34.0) | 2.9 (37.2) | 5.7 (42.3) | 10.0 (50.0) | 13.7 (56.7) | 15.2 (59.4) | 14.9 (58.8) | 11.2 (52.2) | 8.1 (46.6) | 3.9 (39.0) | 1.3 (34.3) | 7.4 (45.3) |
| Mean minimum °C (°F) | −8.7 (16.3) | −7.4 (18.7) | −3.6 (25.5) | −1.0 (30.2) | 3.6 (38.5) | 7.6 (45.7) | 10.0 (50.0) | 9.4 (48.9) | 5.3 (41.5) | 0.6 (33.1) | −3.7 (25.3) | −7.4 (18.7) | −11.1 (12.0) |
| Record low °C (°F) | −18.0 (−0.4) | −21.6 (−6.9) | −11.9 (10.6) | −5.2 (22.6) | −1.4 (29.5) | 3.2 (37.8) | 5.3 (41.5) | 4.5 (40.1) | 0.6 (33.1) | −5.9 (21.4) | −10.4 (13.3) | −19.9 (−3.8) | −21.6 (−6.9) |
| Average precipitation mm (inches) | 48.6 (1.91) | 49.1 (1.93) | 54.3 (2.14) | 65.9 (2.59) | 103.4 (4.07) | 87.5 (3.44) | 92.2 (3.63) | 83.3 (3.28) | 76.3 (3.00) | 79.9 (3.15) | 70.4 (2.77) | 66.9 (2.63) | 877.9 (34.56) |
| Average extreme snow depth cm (inches) | 4.0 (1.6) | 3.5 (1.4) | 1.2 (0.5) | 0.3 (0.1) | 0 (0) | 0 (0) | 0 (0) | 0 (0) | 0 (0) | 0 (0) | 0.7 (0.3) | 3.1 (1.2) | 7.8 (3.1) |
| Average precipitation days (≥ 0.1 mm) | 15.3 | 14.1 | 14.3 | 13.7 | 15.6 | 14.0 | 14.3 | 14.3 | 12.2 | 14.8 | 15.0 | 17.1 | 174.5 |
| Average relative humidity (%) | 80.5 | 75.3 | 68.9 | 65.2 | 67.6 | 66.8 | 65.6 | 67.9 | 73.7 | 79.8 | 82.1 | 81.5 | 72.9 |
| Mean monthly sunshine hours | 64.7 | 91.8 | 146.8 | 181.0 | 206.8 | 232.7 | 250.5 | 234.4 | 177.1 | 115.4 | 66.6 | 56.3 | 1,823.9 |
| Average ultraviolet index | 1 | 2 | 3 | 5 | 6 | 8 | 8 | 7 | 6 | 5 | 3 | 1 | 5 |
Source 1: DWD Open Data
Source 2: Weatheronline.de, Meteociel.fr, weather-atlas, and wetterdienst

== Government ==
Freiburg is known as an "eco-city". In June 1995, the Freiburg city council adopted a resolution that it would permit construction only of "low-energy buildings" on municipal land, and all new buildings must comply with certain low energy specifications. The neighbourhoods of Vauban and Rieselfeld were developed and built in the late 1990s in accordance with the principles of sustainability. The city is also home to a branch of the Federal Office for Radiation Protection, as well as solar industry and research. The citizens of Freiburg are known in Germany for their love of cycling and recycling. Freiburg is host to a number of international organisations, in particular, ICLEI – Local Governments for Sustainability, International Solar Energy Society, and the City Mayors Foundation. Politically, it is a longtime stronghold of the Alliance 90/The Greens, who have seen consistent success since the 1990s and have been the largest party on the city council since 2004. For many years, they performed more strongly in Freiburg than any other major city: former mayor Dieter Salomon, who served from 2002 to 2018, was the first member of the Greens to hold such an office in a city of over 100,000 people.

=== Mayor ===
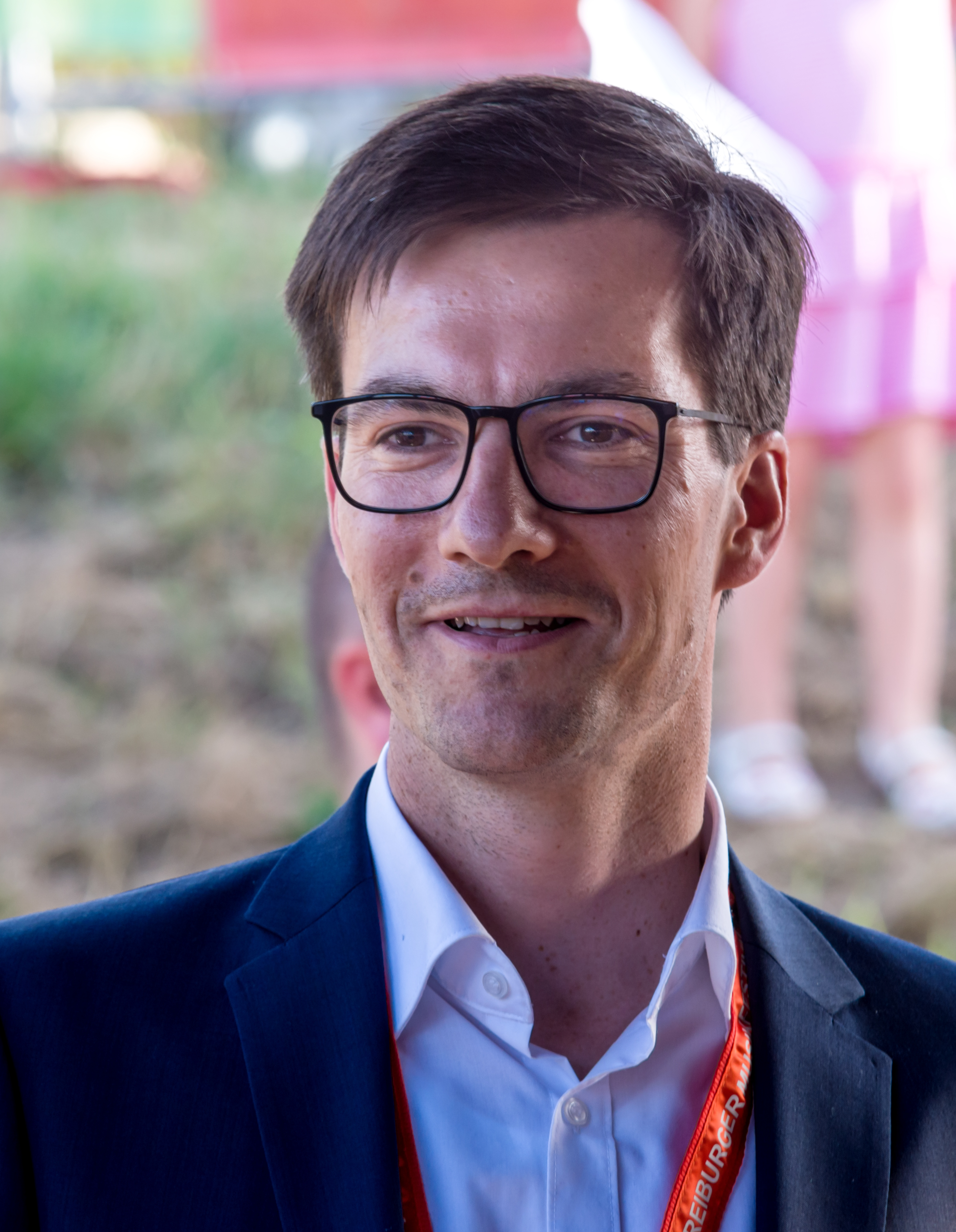
Martin Horn, Mayor of Freiburg

Results of the second round of the 2018 mayoral election

The current mayor of Freiburg is Martin Horn since 2018. He was previously a member of the Social Democratic Party (SPD) but left before running for mayor. In the election, he was supported by the SPD and the Free Democratic Party (FDP). The most recent mayoral election was held on 22 April 2018, with a runoff held on 6 May, and the results were as follows:

| Candidate | Party | First round | | Second round | |
| Candidate | Party | Votes | % | Votes | % |
|---|---|---|---|---|---|
| Martin Horn | Independent (SPD, FDP) | 30,067 | 34.7 | 38,907 | 44.2 |
| Dieter Salomon | Alliance 90/The Greens | 27,094 | 31.3 | 27,014 | 30.7 |
| Monika Stein | Green Alternative Freiburg (LiSSt/Junges/UFF) | 22,726 | 26.2 | 21,237 | 24.1 |
| Anton Behringer | Independent | 3,244 | 3.7 | 796 | 0.9 |
| Stephan Wermter | Independent | 2,252 | 2.6 | Withdrew | |
| Manfred Kröber | Independent (Green) | 1,240 | 1.4 | Withdrew | |
| Other | | 70 | 0.1 | 45 | 0.1 |
| Valid votes | | 86,693 | 99.5 | 87,999 | 99.8 |
| Invalid votes | | 425 | 0.5 | 195 | 0.2 |
| Total | | 87,118 | 100.0 | 88,194 | 100.0 |
| Electorate/voter turnout | | 170,793 | 51.0 | 170,419 | 51.8 |
Source: City of Freiburg (1st round, 2nd round)

=== City council ===
The Freiburg city council governs the city alongside the Mayor. The most recent city council election was held on 9 June 2024, and the results were as follows:

| Party | Votes | % | +/- | Seats | +/- |
|---|---|---|---|---|---|
| Alliance 90/The Greens (Grüne) | 1,204,978 | 23.8 | ▼2.7 | 12 | ▼1 |
| Social Democratic Party (SPD) | 635,000 | 12.5 | ▼0.2 | 6 | 0 |
| Christian Democratic Union (CDU) | 608,477 | 12.0 | ▲0.2 | 6 | 0 |
| Left List – Solidary City (LiSSt) | 391,672 | 7.7 | ▲0.8 | 4 | ▲1 |
| Free Voters Baden-Württemberg (FW) | 356,807 | 7.0 | ▲1.5 | 3 | 0 |
| Alternative for Germany (AfD) | 230,145 | 4.5 | ▲0.9 | 2 | 0 |
| Free Democratic Party (FDP) | 222,286 | 4.4 | ▲0.6 | 2 | 0 |
| Volt Germany (Volt) | 189,969 | 3.8 | New | 2 | New |
| Green Alternative Freiburg (GAF) | 181,590 | 3.6 | ▼2.9 | 2 | ▼1 |
| Young Freiburg (Junges) | 164,837 | 3.3 | ▼0.5 | 2 | 0 |
| Urban Freiburg (UFR) | 147,091 | 2.9 | ▼0.1 | 1 | 0 |
| Culture List Freiburg (KULT) | 131,856 | 2.6 | ▲0.4 | 1 | 0 |
| Independent Women Freiburg (UFF) | 127,430 | 2.5 | ▲0.6 | 1 | 0 |
| Livable Freiburg (FL) | 119,134 | 2.4 | ▼2.1 | 1 | ▼1 |
| Die PARTEI | 120,187 | 2.4 | ▼0.3 | 1 | 0 |
| List for Participation and Inclusion (LTI) | 89,487 | 1.8 | ▲0.4 | 1 | 0 |
| Citizens for Freiburg (BFF) | 62,139 | 1.2 | ▼0.7 | 1 | 0 |
| For Freiburg (FFR) | 38,470 | 0.8 | ▼0.2 | 0 | 0 |
| SPITZ | 34,132 | 0.7 | New | 0 | New |
| Anarchist Pogo Party of Germany (APPD) | 8,788 | 0.2 | New | 0 | New |
| Valid votes | 5,064,475 | 100.0 | | 48 | ±0 |
| Invalid ballots | 2,501 | 2.2 | | | |
| Total ballots | 115,265 | 100.0 | | | |
| Electorate/voter turnout | 172,394 | 66.9 | ▲4.1 | | |
Source: City of Freiburg

== Demographics ==
=== Historical populations ===
Historical population
| Year | Pop. | ±% |
|---|---|---|
| 1385 | 9,000 | — |
| 1620 | 10,000 | +11.1% |
| 1871 | 24,668 | +146.7% |
| 1900 | 61,504 | +149.3% |
| 1910 | 83,324 | +35.5% |
| 1919 | 87,946 | +5.5% |
| 1925 | 90,475 | +2.9% |
| 1933 | 99,122 | +9.6% |
| 1939 | 110,110 | +11.1% |
| 1950 | 109,717 | −0.4% |
| 1961 | 145,016 | +32.2% |
| 1970 | 162,222 | +11.9% |
| 1987 | 178,672 | +10.1% |
| 2001 | 208,294 | +16.6% |
| 2011 | 209,628 | +0.6% |
| 2022 | 233,040 | +11.2% |

=== Nationality ===
Largest groups of foreigners by country of origin
| Nationality | Population (2022) |
|---|---|
| Italy | 3,211 |
| Ukraine | 2,825 |
| Romania | 2,603 |
| Turkey | 1,992 |
| Serbia | 1,761 |
| Syria | 1,652 |
| France | 1,574 |
| Croatia | 1,382 |
| Poland | 1,235 |
| Kosovo | 1,124 |

=== Religion ===
==== Christianity ====
Freiburg belonged to Austria until 1805 and remained Catholic, although surrounding villages like Haslach, Opfingen, Tiengen, and the surrounding land ruled by the Margrave of Baden became Protestant as a result of the Reformation. The city was part of the Diocese of Konstanz until 1821. That same year, Freiburg became an episcopal see of the Roman Catholic Archdiocese of Freiburg. Due to a dispute between the government of Baden and the Holy See, the archbishop officially took office in 1827.

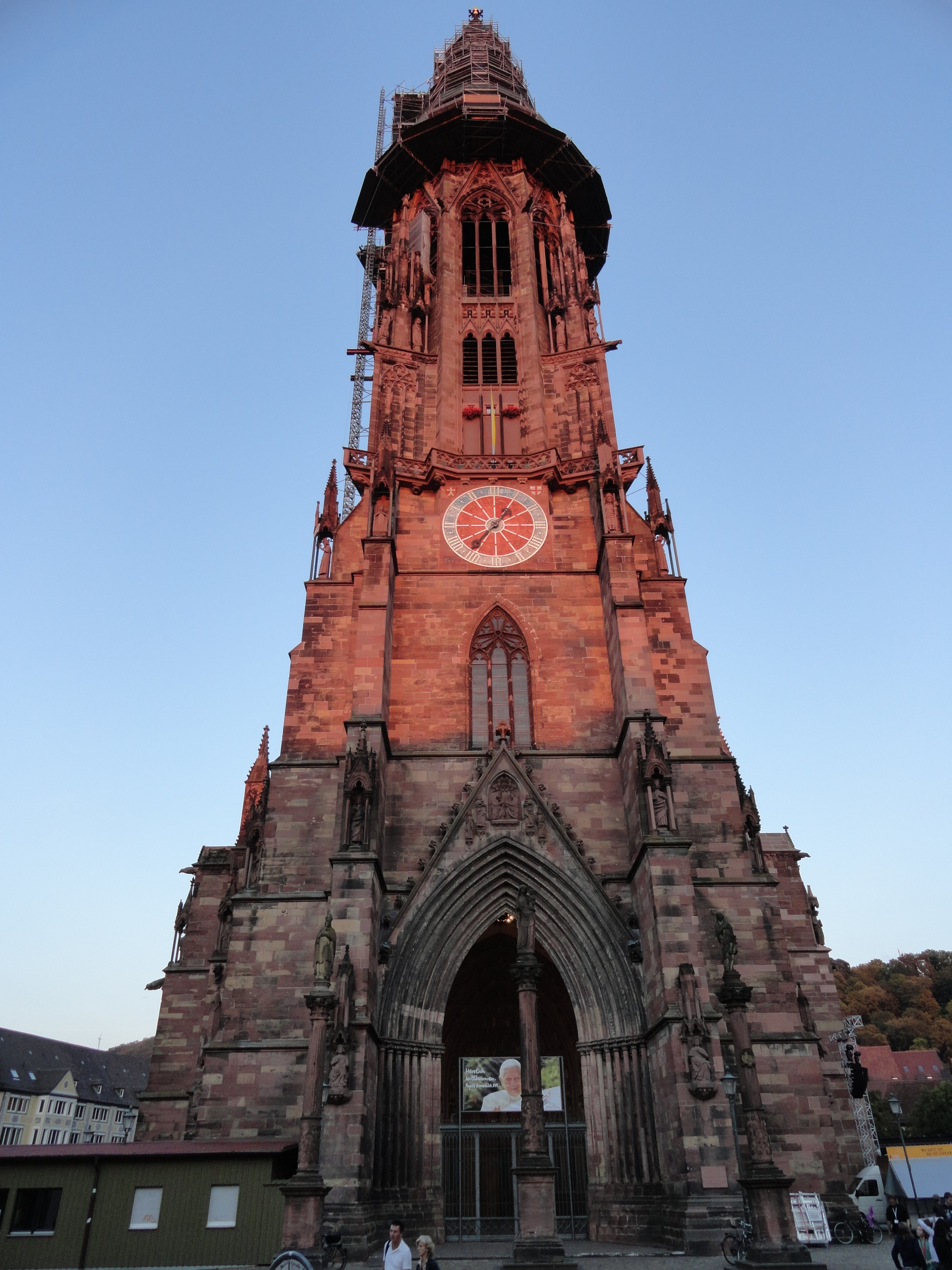
The Freiburger Minster: one of Freiburg's most famous landmarks

The borders of the archdiocese correspond with the borders of the former province of Baden and the former Margraviate of Hohenzollern. The cathedral, in which the bishop resides, is Freiburg Minster. Also, part of the ecclesiastical province of Freiburg are the suffragan dioceses of Mainz and Rottenburg-Stuttgart.

Until 1929, the dioceses of Limburg and Fulda also belonged to this ecclesiastical province. The Archbishop of Freiburg holds the title of metropolitan and the German headquarters of the link to Caritas Germany is in Freiburg.

Saint George (the flag of Freiburg has the cross of George), Lambert of Maastricht and the catacomb saint, Alexander, are the patron saints of Freiburg. Many works of art depicting these saints are in the Freiburg Minster, on the Minster square, just as in the museums and archives of the city, including some by Hans Baldung Grien, Hans Holbein the Younger and Gregorius Sickinger.

In 1805, with the attack of Breisgau on the Grand Duchy of Baden by a Catholic ruler, many Protestants moved into the city. Since 2007, any Protestants who are not part of a 'free church' belong to the newly founded deanery of Freiburg as part of the parish of Südbaden which in itself is a part of the Landeskirche Baden.

The seat of the Evangelical Lutheran Church in Baden, a free Lutheran church, is situated in Freiburg. There are multiple other free Protestant churches: e.g., the Calvary Chapel or Chrischona International. An old congregation has existed in Freiburg since the late 1900s, which utilises the old monastery church of the Ursulines in the black monastery at the border of the old city center. The Catholic Church of St. Maria Schutz has been made available for Masses by Greek, Serbian, Russian and Rumanian Orthodox congregations.

==== Judaism ====
Jews are said to have lived in the city before 1230, but it was only after 1230 that they supposedly founded an official community in the Webergasse (a small street within the town center). The counts of Freiburg bought the lucrative Schutzjude, which means that all personal information on Jews living in Freiburg was directly sent to Konrad II and his co-reigning son Friedrich. The two issued a comprising letter promising safety and liberty to all local Jews on 12 October 1338. It lost all value shortly after, however, on 1 January 1349. Although the plague had not yet broken out in the city, Jews were accused of having spread it and taken into custody. All Jews except pregnant women were burned alive on 31 January 1349. The remaining children were forced to be baptised. This pogrom left Jews very hesitant to resettle in the city. In 1401, the city council decreed a regulation banning all Jews from Freiburg (orig. Middle High German dialect: "daz dekein Jude ze Friburg niemmerme sin sol". This was officially reaffirmed by King Sigismund with a ban for life (orig. German: “Ewige Vertreibung”) in 1424. Not until 1809 were Jews again allowed permanent residence within the city. They subsequently founded a Jewish community in 1836.

At the Kristallnacht in 1938, the synagogue, built in 1870, was set afire. Numerous shops and apartments of Jewish citizens of Freiburg were devastated and plundered by National Socialists without the intervention of police or fire department. Male, wealthy, Jewish citizens were kidnapped and taken to concentration camps (in Buchenwald and Dachau) where they were subjected to forced labor or executed and their money and property stolen.

On 22 October 1940, the remaining Jews of Baden and Pfalz were deported to Camp de Gurs in southern France. One among many collecting points was Annaplatz. So-called 'Stolpersteine', tiles with names and dates on them, commemorate the victims of the prosecution of Jews during the Nazi-Era in the city's cobble. Journalist Käthe Vordtriede of the Volkswacht even received two Stolpersteine to commemorate her life. The first one was inserted into the ground in front of the Vordtriede-Haus Freiburg in 2006 and the second one in front of the Basler Hof, the regional authorities, in spring 2013. This was also the seat of the Gestapo until 1941, where unrelenting people were cruelly interrogated, held prisoner or deported. The only solutions were flight or emigration. The Vordtriede family managed to escape in time.

== Education ==
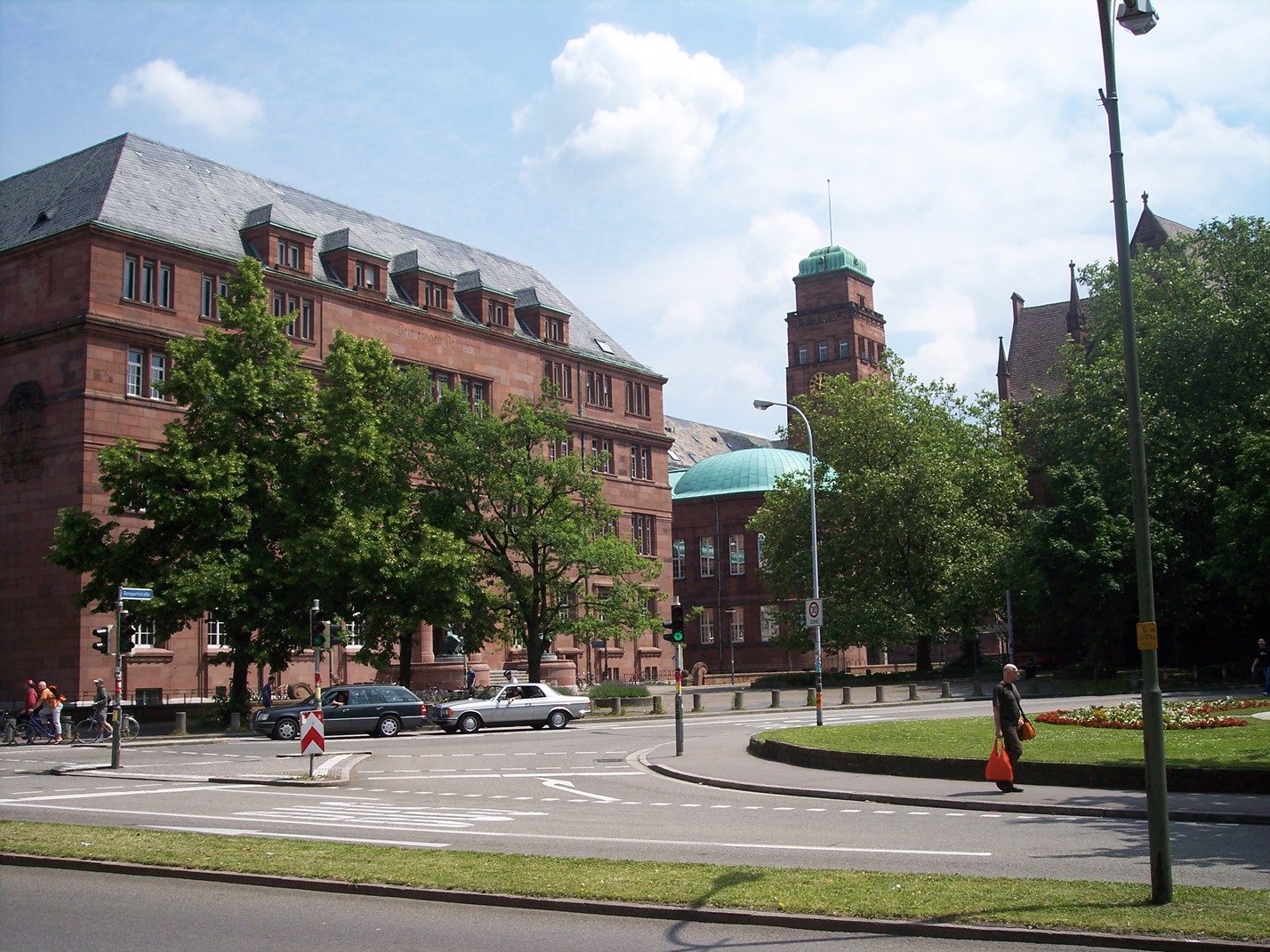
Albert-Ludwigs University

Freiburg is a center of academia and research, in which numerous intellectual figures and Nobel Laureates have lived, worked, and taught.

The city houses one of the oldest and most renowned of German universities, the Albert Ludwig University of Freiburg, as well as its medical center. Alma mater to many eminent figures as Johann Eck, Max Weber, Edmund Husserl, Martin Heidegger, and Friedrich Hayek, it is one of Europe's top research and teaching institutions.

Freiburg also plays host to various other educational and research institutes, such as the Freiburg University of Education, the Protestant University for Applied Sciences Freiburg, Freiburg Music Academy, the Catholic University of Applied Sciences Freiburg, the International University of Cooperative Education IUCE, three Max Planck institutes, five Fraunhofer institutes, and one Leibniz institute.

The city is home to the IES Abroad European Union program, which allows students to study the development and activities of the EU. This is in addition to an Environmental Science and Sustainability program focused on Freiburg's famed green lifestyle and infrastructure. IES Abroad also offers a German Language and Area Studies program where visiting students get to take classes at the University of Freiburg.

The DFG / LFA Freiburg, a French-German high school established by the 1963 Élysée Treaty, is in the city. UWC Robert Bosch College is among the newest members of the United World Colleges (UWC) movement, one of its eighteen colleges around the world, having started accepting students in September 2014.

== Transport ==
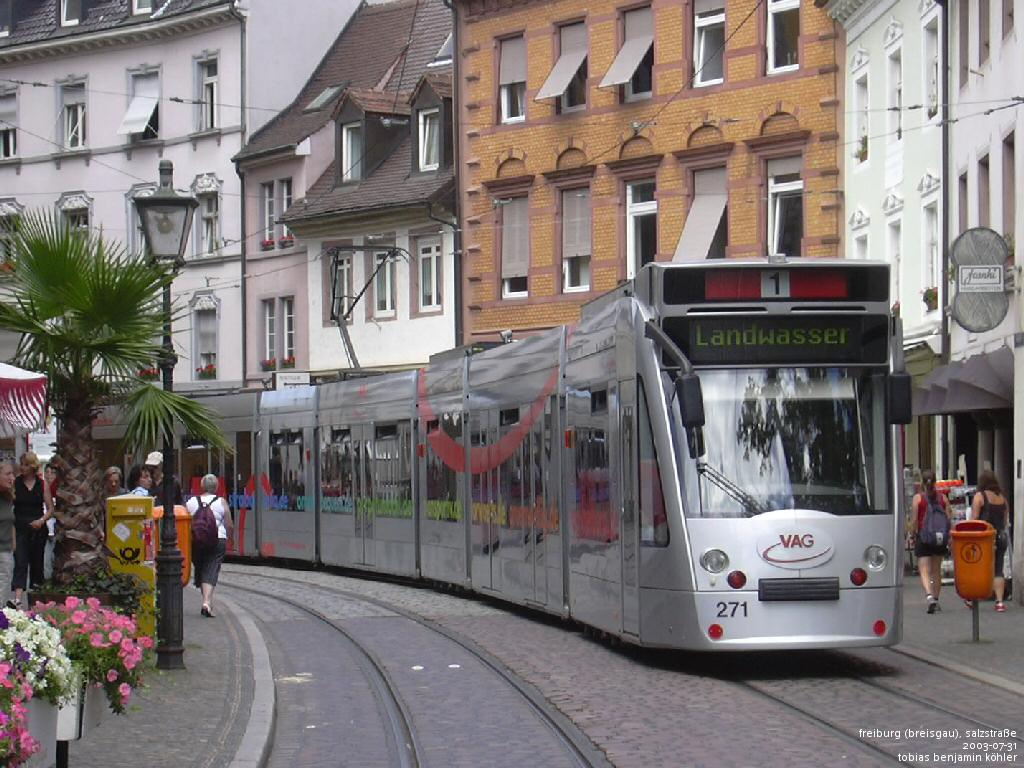
Freiburg VAG tram

Freiburg has a large pedestrian zone in the city centre where no motor cars are allowed. Freiburg also has an extensive public transport system, operated by the city-owned VAG Freiburg. The backbone of the system is the Freiburg tramway network, supplemented by feeder buses. The tram network is very popular as the low fares allow for unlimited transport in the city and surrounding area. Furthermore, any ticket for a concert, sports, or other event is also valid for use on public transport. The tram network is so vast that 70% of the population live within 500m of a tram stop with a tram every 7–8 mins.

Freiburg is on the main Frankfurt am Main – Basel railway line, with frequent and fast long-distance passenger services from the Freiburg Hauptbahnhof to major German and other European cities. Other railway lines run east into the Black Forest and west to Breisach and are served by the Breisgau S-Bahn. The line to Breisach is the remaining stub of the Freiburg–Colmar international railway, severed in 1945 when the railway bridge over the Rhine at Breisach was destroyed, and was never replaced.

The city also is served by the A5 Frankfurt am Main – Basel motorway.

Freiburg is served by EuroAirport Basel-Mulhouse-Freiburg in France, close to the borders of both Germany and Switzerland, 70 km (43 mi) south of Freiburg. Karlsruhe/Baden-Baden Airport is approximately 100 km (62 mi) north of Freiburg and is also served by several airlines. The nearest larger international airports include Zurich (130 km (81 mi)), Stuttgart (200 km (120 mi)), and Frankfurt/Main (260 km (160 mi)). The nearby Flugplatz Freiburg (IATA: QFB, ICAO: EDTF), a small airfield in the Messe, Freiburg district, lacks commercial service but is used for private aviation.

Car share websites such as BlaBlaCar are commonly used among Freiburg residents, since they are considered relatively safe.

The investment in transport has resulted in a large increase in both cycle, pedestrian and public transport usage with projections of car journeys accounting for 29% of journey times.

== Sports ==
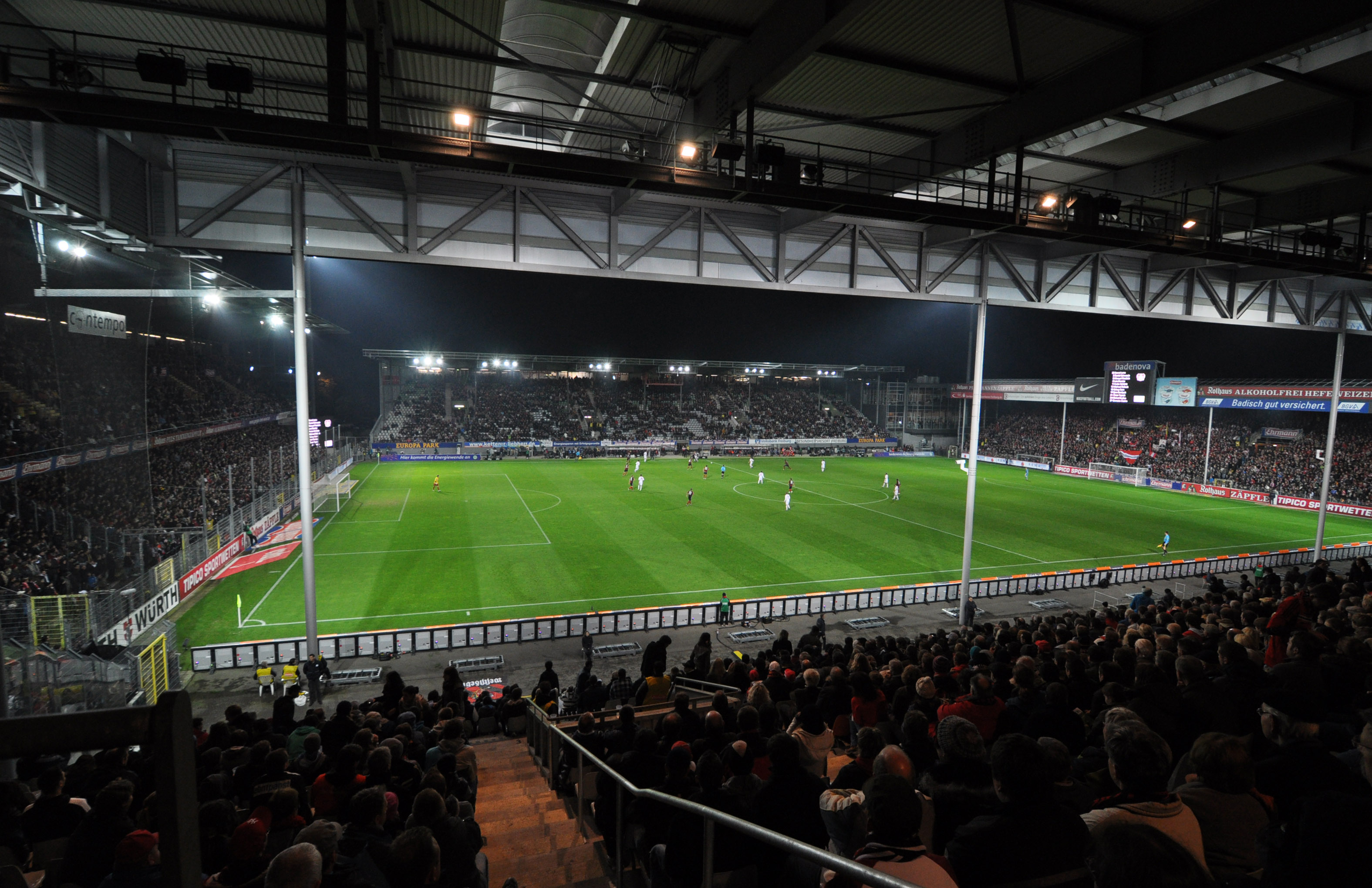
Schwarzwald-Stadion is the former home ground of Bundesliga club SC Freiburg.

The Freiburger FC won the 1907 German football championship. Afterwards, the city experienced a 115-year drought where no sports team won a national championship again. In 2022, the drought was finally ended by the Eisvögel USC Freiburg who won the 1. Damen-Basketball-Bundesliga title.

Freiburg is home to football teams SC Freiburg, which plays at the Europa-Park Stadion and is represented in the 1. or 2. Bundesliga since 1978, and Freiburger FC. In 2016, SC Freiburg got promoted to the highest league for the fifth time in its club history. The club became generally known in Germany for its steady staffing policy. Achim Stocker was president of the club from 1972 until his death in 2009. Longtime coach was Volker Finke (1991–2007), to whose initiative the football school of the club goes back. In 2004, SC Freiburg celebrated its 100th anniversary. Since December 2011, the coach is Christian Streich. The women's team of SC Freiburg plays in the first Women's Bundesliga.

Freiburg is represented in the first women's basketball league by the Eisvögel (Kingfisher) USC Freiburg. In the season 2005/2006, the Kingfishers took second place after the end of the second round, in the season 2006/2007 it was the fourth place. The men's team of the USC played in the 2009/10 season in the ProA (2nd Bundesliga). The Freiburg men's team played their last first-division season in 1998/1999. Currently, season 2018/19, the men's team plays in the Oberliga and the women's team in the regional league.

Freiburg also has the EHC Freiburg ice hockey team, which plays at the Franz-Siegel Halle. In the season 2003/2004 the EHC Freiburg (the wolves) played in the DEL, the highest German ice hockey league. Currently, season 2018/19, they play in the second league (DEL2).

Additionally, there is the RC Freiburg Rugby union team, which competes in the second Bundesliga South (Baden Württemberg). The home ground of the club, the only rugby sports field in the wider area, is located in March-Hugstetten.

Then, there is the volleyball men's team of the FT 1844 Freiburg, which plays in the second Bundesliga since 2001 and the handball women's team of the HSG Freiburg, which plays in the 3rd Women's Handball League.

From 1925 to 1984, the Schauinsland Races took place on an old logging track. The course is still used periodically for European Hill Climb Championships.

== Culture ==
=== Art and museums ===
The association Kunst in Freiburg is an association of galleries and exhibition spaces in Freiburg. They organize joint exhibition projects such as the annual art night nocturne.

The Biennial for Freiburg, which is organized by the association Perspektiven für Kunst in Freiburg e.V., has been taking place since 2021.

Founded in 1827, the Kunstverein Freiburg is one of the oldest in Germany. In the building of the former Marienbad, the Kunstverein presents current trends and, above all, young positions in contemporary art at an international level.

The Augustiner Museum presents its collection of art from the Middle Ages to the Baroque as well as 19th century paintings.

The Museum of Contemporary Art is a forum for social debates, commonly discussing art and the public. Exhibitions reflect elementary themes of our time. From the collection of 20th and 21st century works, a selection of classical modernism is displayed.

Colombischlössle Archaeological Museum: The neo-Gothic palace houses precious finds from the Stone Age to the early Middle Ages. The Alamanni treasure chamber displays jewelry and magnificent weapons from Alamanni graves.

The Museum of Nature and Man holds collections in natural history and ethnology, focusing on natural ecosystems and human cultures. The museum offers educational exhibits and programs for visitors.

Museum of City History: Treasures from 900 years of the city's history can be seen in the late baroque house of the artist Johann Christian Wentzinger.

Documentation Center for National Socialism Freiburg: Built in 1936, the former public transport office on Rotteckring will be home to the National Socialist Documentation Center by 2025, providing information about the National Socialist era in Freiburg.

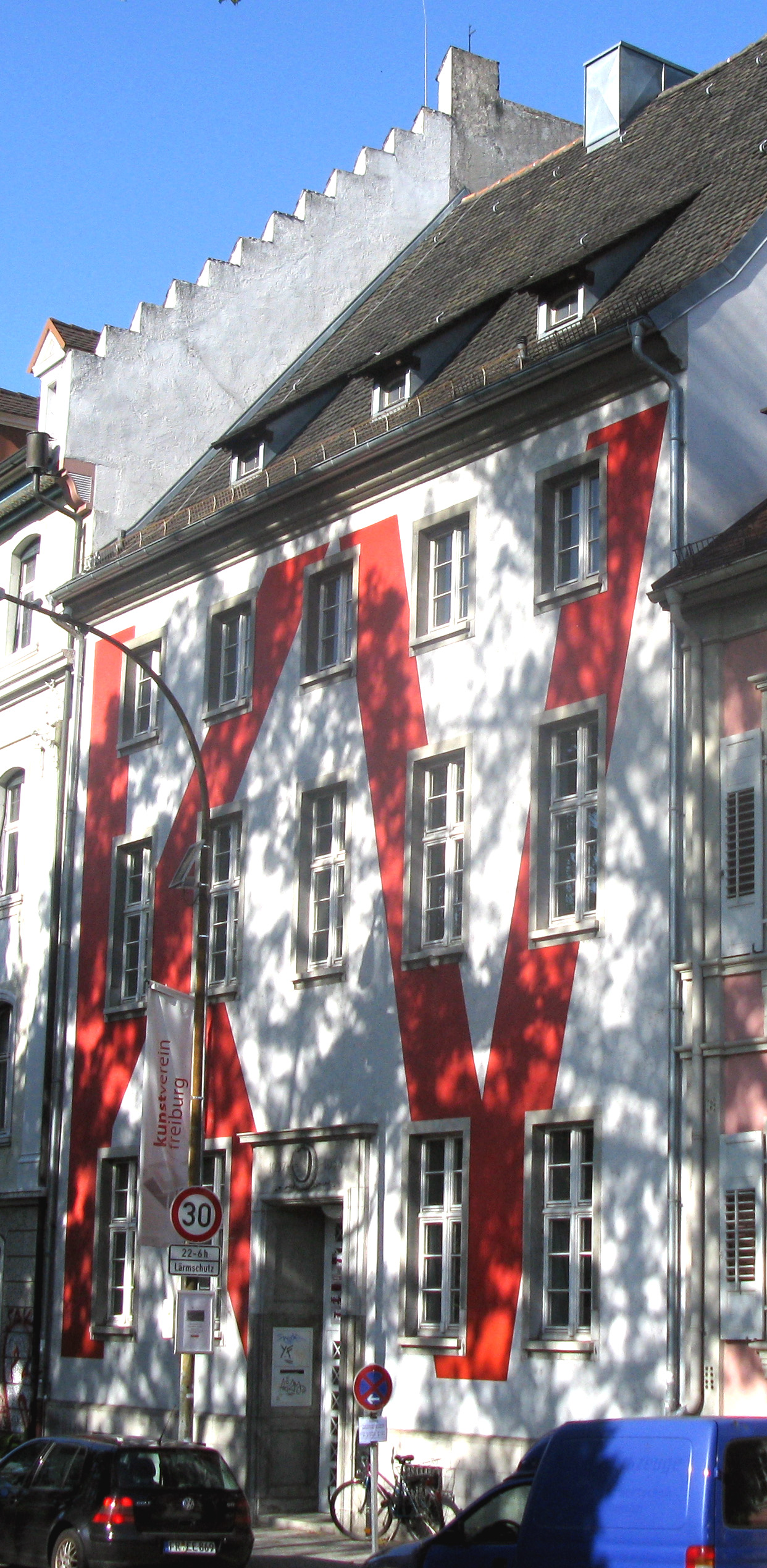
Kunstverein Freiburg

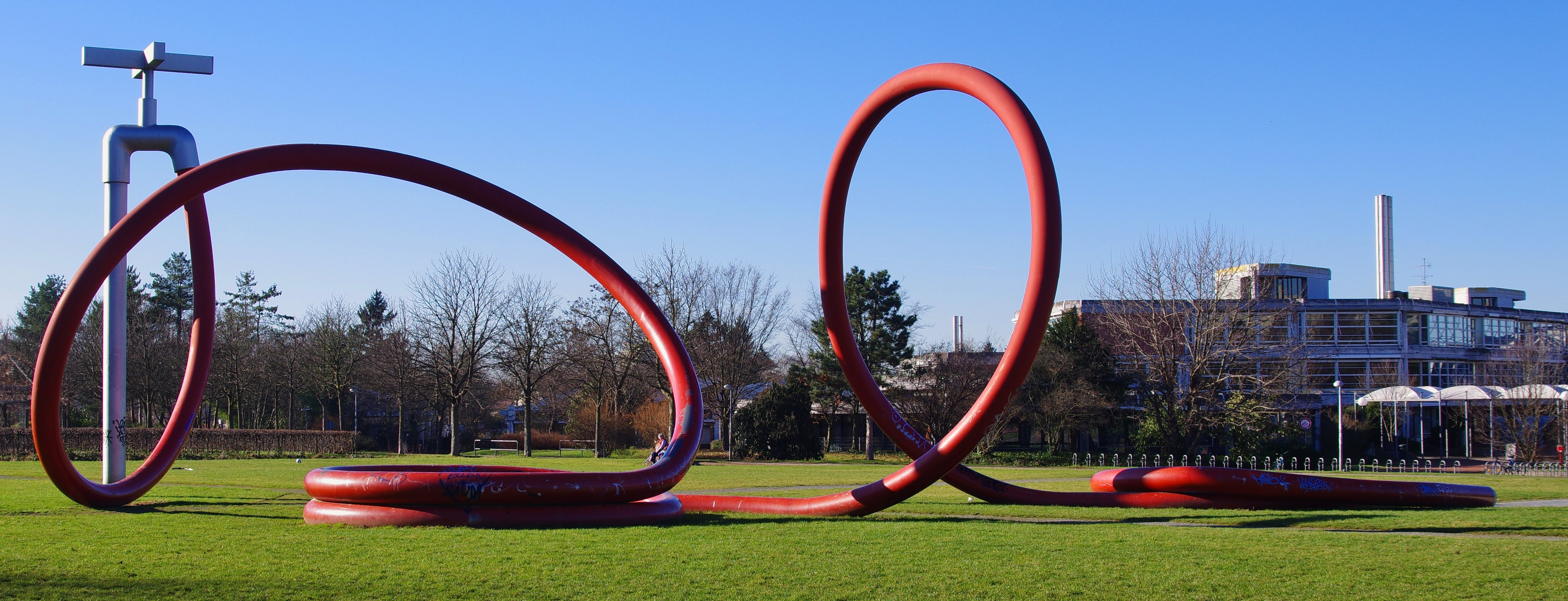
Gartenschlauch by Claes Oldenburg and Coosje van Bruggen at Eschholzpark Freiburg

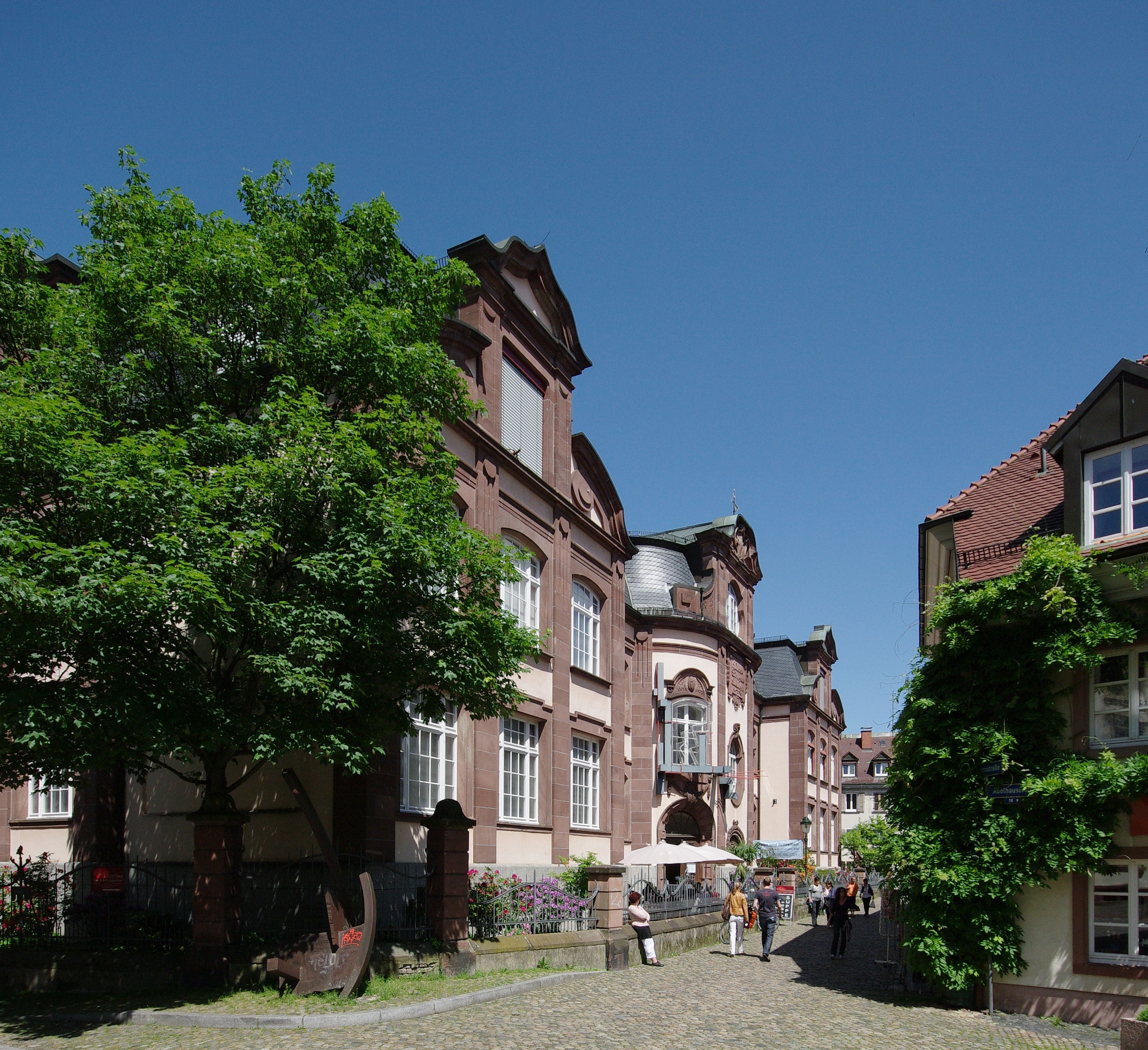
Museum für Neue Kunst Freiburg

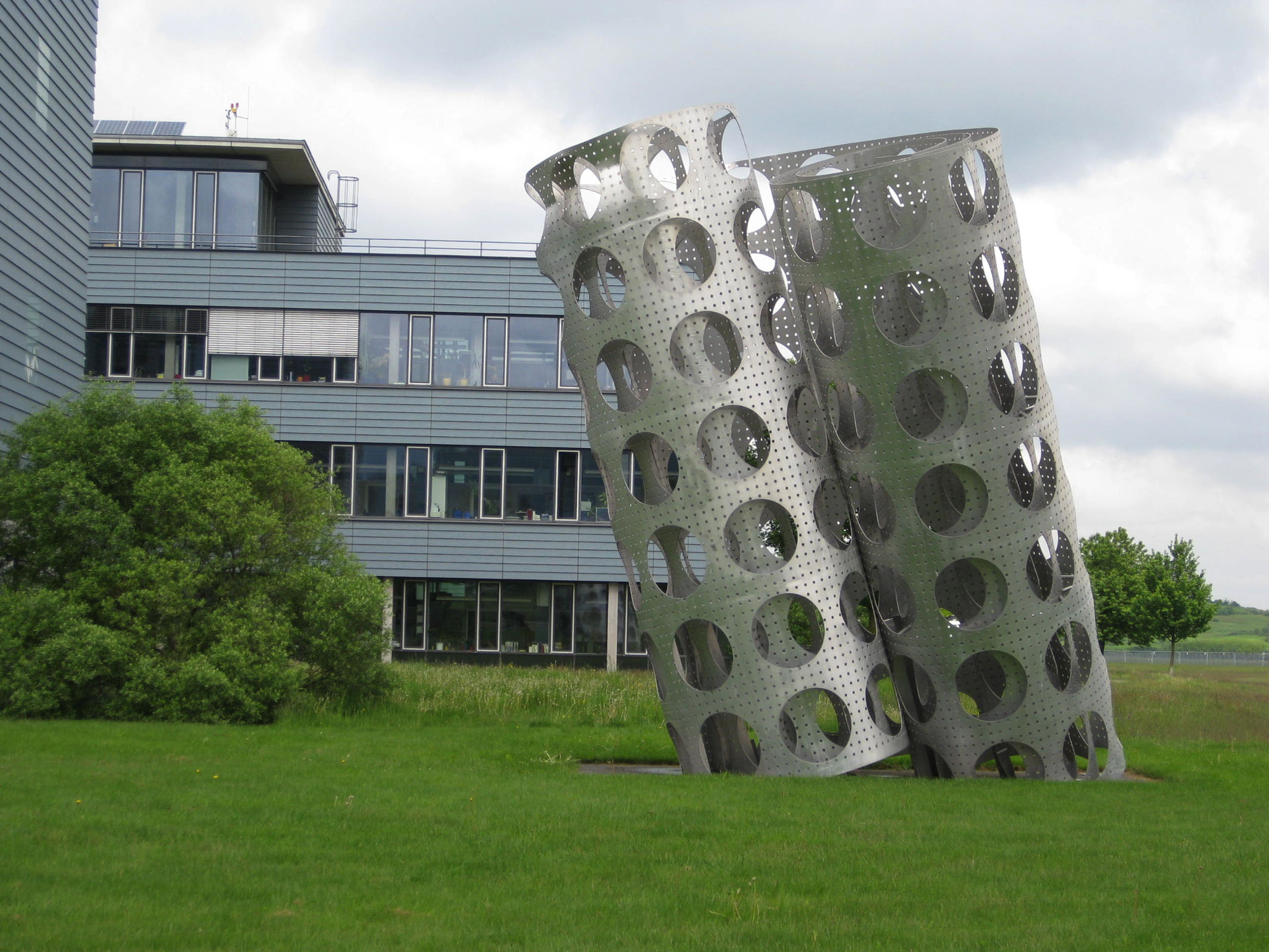
Olaf Metzel Doppelrolle at 11. Fakultät der Uni (2003)

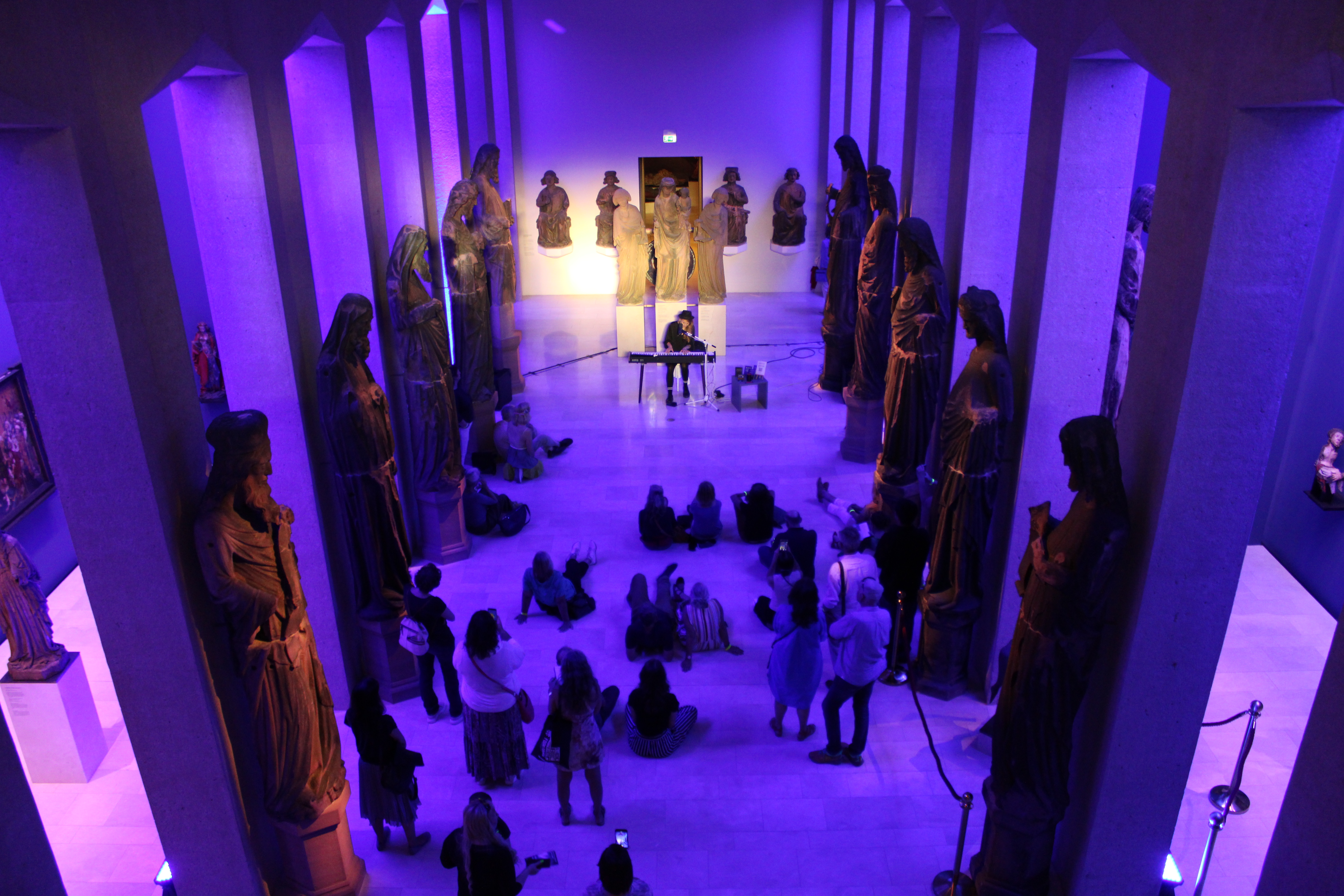
Museumnight at Augustinermuseum Freiburg

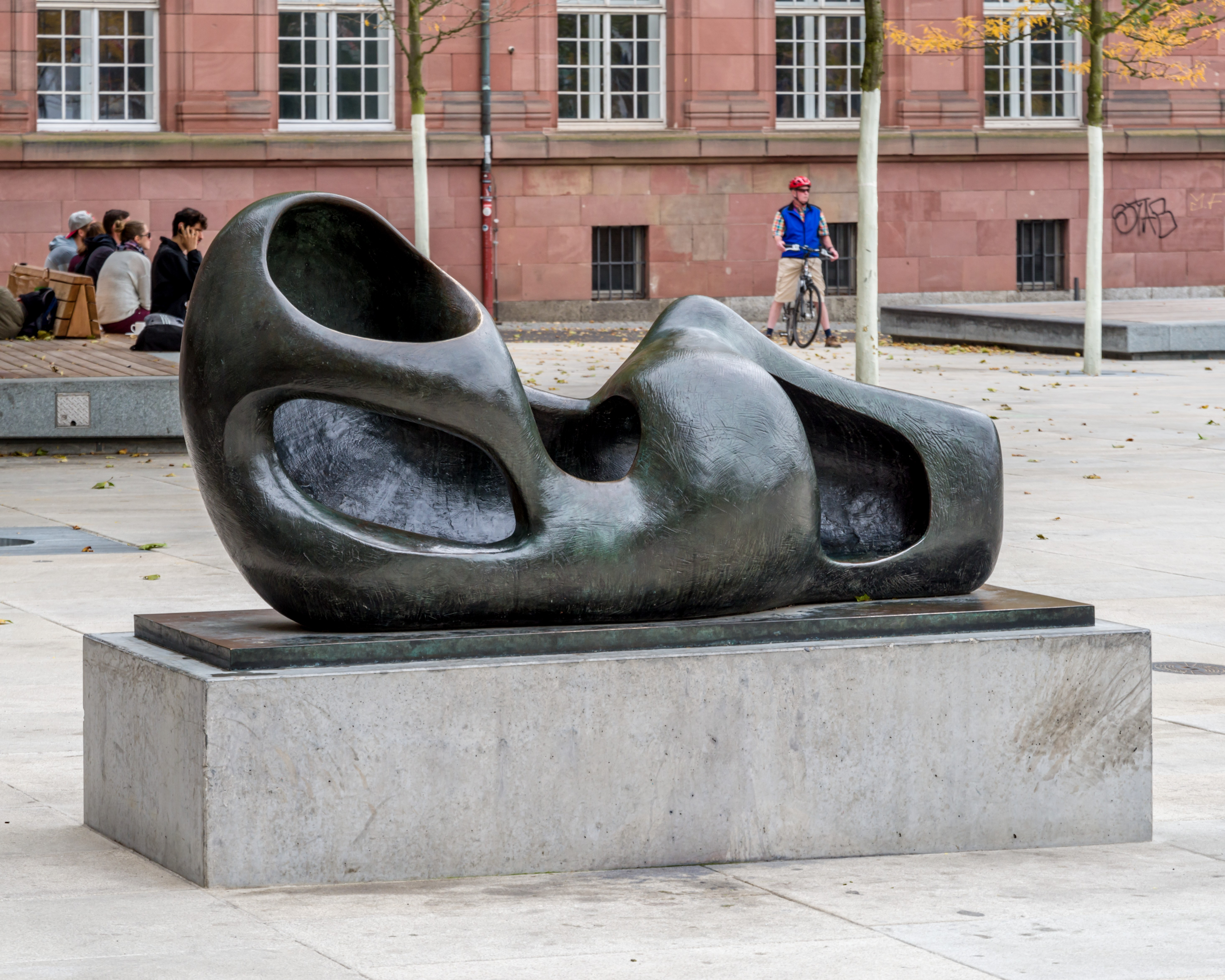
Reclining Figure by Henry Moore

=== Media ===
The regional public broadcaster, SWR, has a broadcast centre and studios in the city.

Local radio is provided by SWR4, and Radio Dreyeckland.

Badische Zeitung is the main local daily paper, covering the Black Forest region.

== Twin towns – sister cities ==
Freiburg im Breisgau is twinned with:

- Besançon, France (1959)
- Granada, Spain (1991)
- Guildford, United Kingdom (1979)
- Innsbruck, Austria (1963)
- Isfahan, Iran (2000)
- Lviv, Ukraine (1989)
- Madison, United States (1987)
- Matsuyama, Japan (1988)
- Padua, Italy (1967)
- Suwon, South Korea (2015)
- Tel Aviv, Israel (2015)
- Wiwilí de Jinotega, Nicaragua (2015)

Iranian president Mahmoud Ahmadinejad's controversial comments, which included questioning the dimension of the Holocaust, have sparked discussions concerning Freiburg's relationship with Isfahan. Immediately following the comments, Freiburg mayor Salomon postponed a trip to Isfahan, but most people involved, especially those in the Alliance '90/The Greens party, were opposed to cancelling the relationship.

== Symbols ==
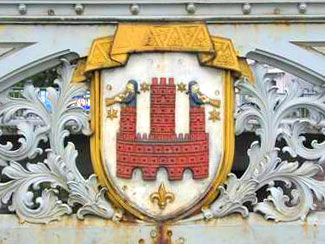
Seal of Freiburg

The city's coat of arms is Argent a cross Gules, the St George's Cross. Saint George is the city's patron saint. The cross also appears on the city's flag, which dates from about 1368, and is identical to that of England, which has the same patron.

The city also has a seal that can be seen in a few places in the inner city. It is a stylised depiction of the façade of the Wasserschlössle, a castle-like waterworks facility built into a hill that overlooks the residential district of Wiehre. The seal depicts a three-towered red castle on a white background, with green-clad trumpeters atop the two outer towers. Beneath the castle is a gold fleur-de-lis.

== Notable people ==
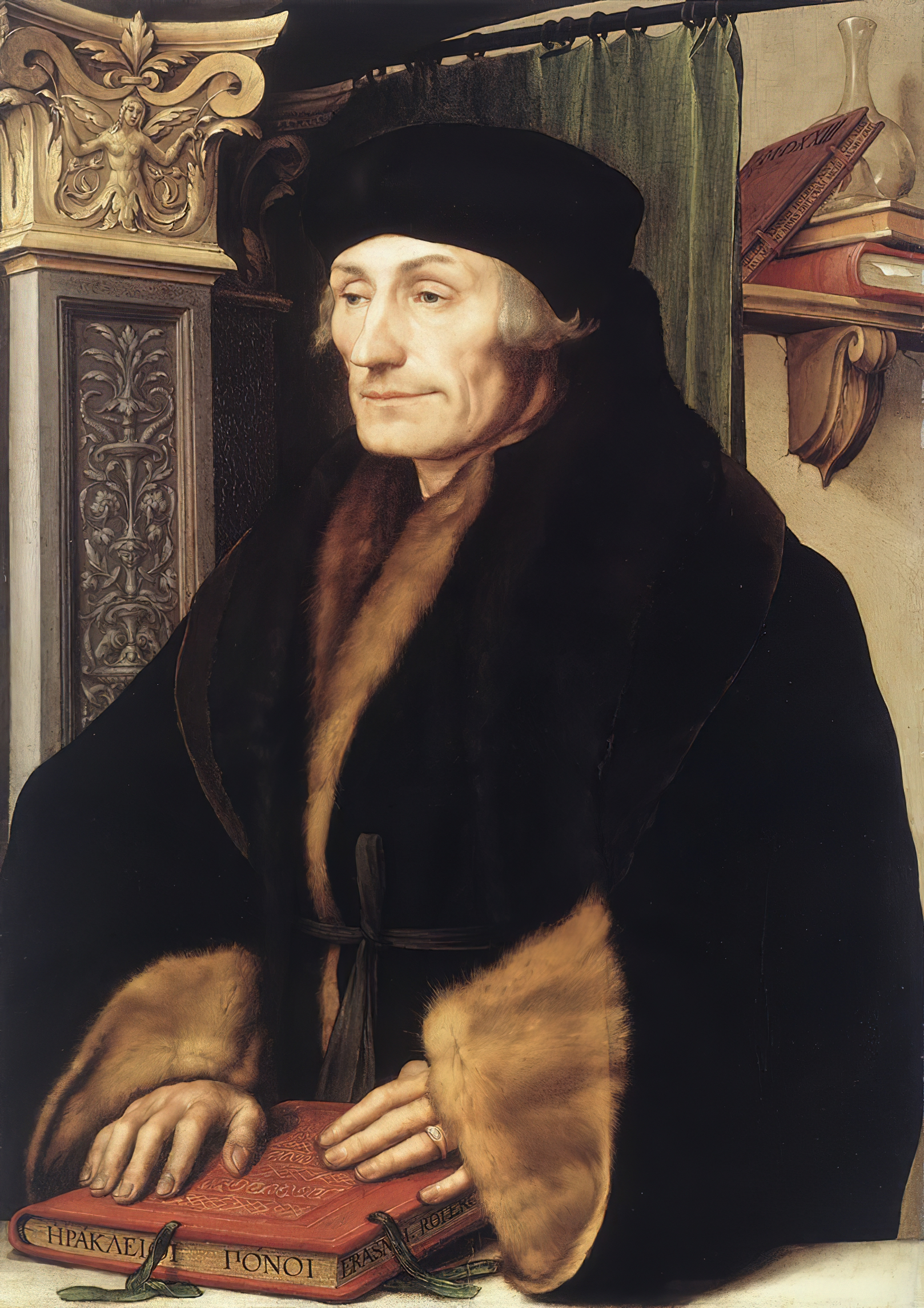
Portraint of Erasmus by Holbein, 1523

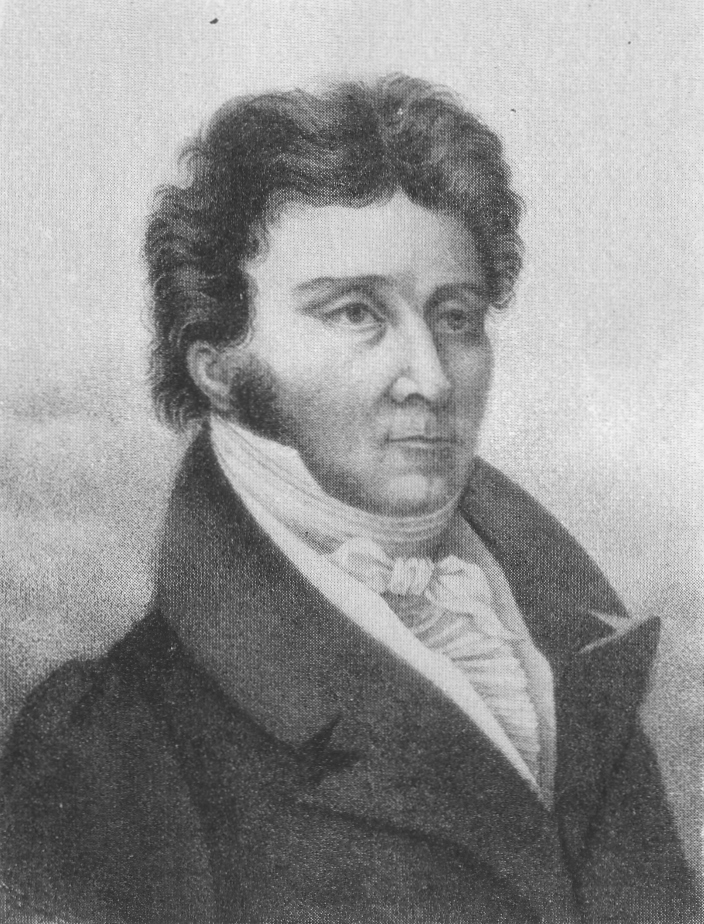
Karl von Rotteck

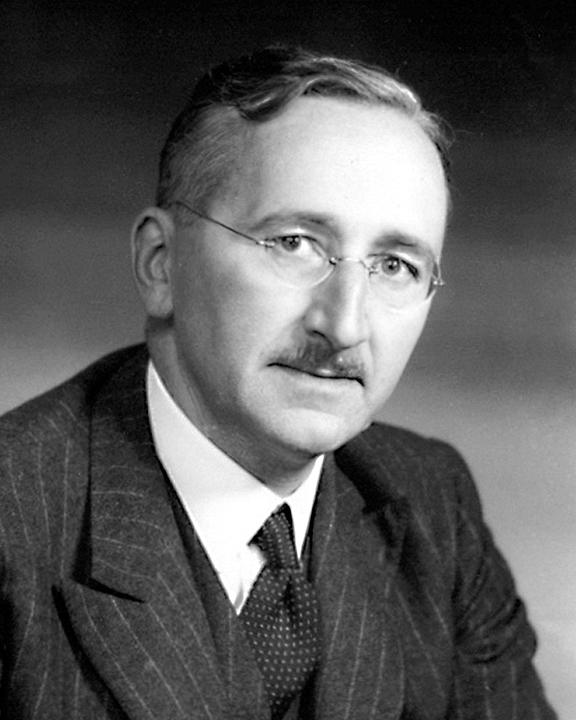
Friedrich Hayek

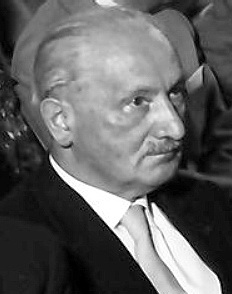
Martin Heidegger, 1960

=== Pre-18th century ===
- Desiderius Erasmus of Rotterdam (1466–1536), Dutch Renaissance humanist and theologian
- Berthold Schwarz (c. 1310–1388), fabled alchemist who introduced gunpowder to Germany
- Martin Waldseemüller (c.1470–1520), Renaissance cartographer

=== 18th century ===
- Joseph von Auffenberg (1798–1857), playwright and poet
- Aloysius Bellecius (1704–1757), Jesuit ascetic author
- Jean-Henri Naderman (1734–1799), leading harp-maker and a music publisher
- Johann Nepomuk Locherer (1773–1837), Roman Catholic priest, theologian and professor
- Karl von Rotteck (1775–1840), political activist, historian, politician and political scientist
- Heinrich Schreiber (1793–1872), Catholic theologian and historian, wrote about Freiburg

=== 19th century ===
- Sepp Allgeier (1895–1968), cinematographer, worked with Leni Riefenstahl
- Kurt Bauch (1897–1975), art historian
- Walter Benjamin (1892–1940), literary critic and philosopher
- Alfred Döblin (1878–1957), physician and novelist
- Barney Dreyfuss (1865–1932), baseball entrepreneur, co-founder of the Major League Baseball World Series
- Walter Eucken (1891–1950), economist of the Freiburg school and father of ordoliberalism
- Arnold Fanck (1889–1974), film director and pioneer of the mountain film genre
- Eugen Fischer (1874–1967), physician who influenced Nazi racial hygiene
- Adolf Furtwangler (1853–1907), archaeologist, teacher, art historian and museum director.
- Max von Gallwitz (1852–1937), general and politician
- Friedrich Gempp (1873–1947), Major General, founder and first director of the Department Defence of Reichswehr
- Hans F. K. Günther (1891–1968), Nazi eugenicist
- Friedrich von Hayek (1899–1992), economist, philosopher, Nobel Prize laureate in economics
- Martin Heidegger (1889–1976), philosopher
- Edmund Husserl (1859–1938), philosopher who established the school of phenomenology
- Hans Jantzen (1881–1967), art historian, specialised in Medieval art
- Wilhelm Lamey (1854–1910), jurist
- Ernst Leumann (1859-1931), Swiss Indologist known for research into Jainism and languages of Turkestan, died locally
- Felix H. Man (1893–1985), photographer, art collector and pioneer photojournalist for Picture Post
- Carl Christian Mez (1866–1944), botanist
- Bernhard Sigmund Schultze (1827–1919), obstetrician and gynecologist
- Hans Spemann (1869–1941) Nobel prize-winning embryologist
- Hermann Staudinger (1881–1965), 1953 Nobel Prize laureate in chemistry "for discoveries about macromolecular chemistry", died locally
- Edith Stein (1891–1942), nun, Saint of the Catholic Church, martyred by the Nazis, Freiburg university faculty member
- Bronisław Trentowski (1808–1869) – Polish philosopher, pedagogue, insurgent and Freemason
- Franz Fischer (1877–1947) – German chemist, discovered the Fischer–Tropsch process process with Hans Tropsch.
- Otto Heinrich Warburg (1883–1970), recipient in 1931 of Nobel Prize in Physiology or Medicine
- Max Weber (1864–1920), lawyer, political economist, and sociologist
- August Weismann (1834–1914), evolutionary biologist
- Joseph Wirth (1879–1956), politician (center), member of the Reichstag, chancellor, foreign minister, minister of the interior
- Engelbert Zaschka (1895–1955), inventor and one of the first German helicopter pioneers

=== 20th century ===
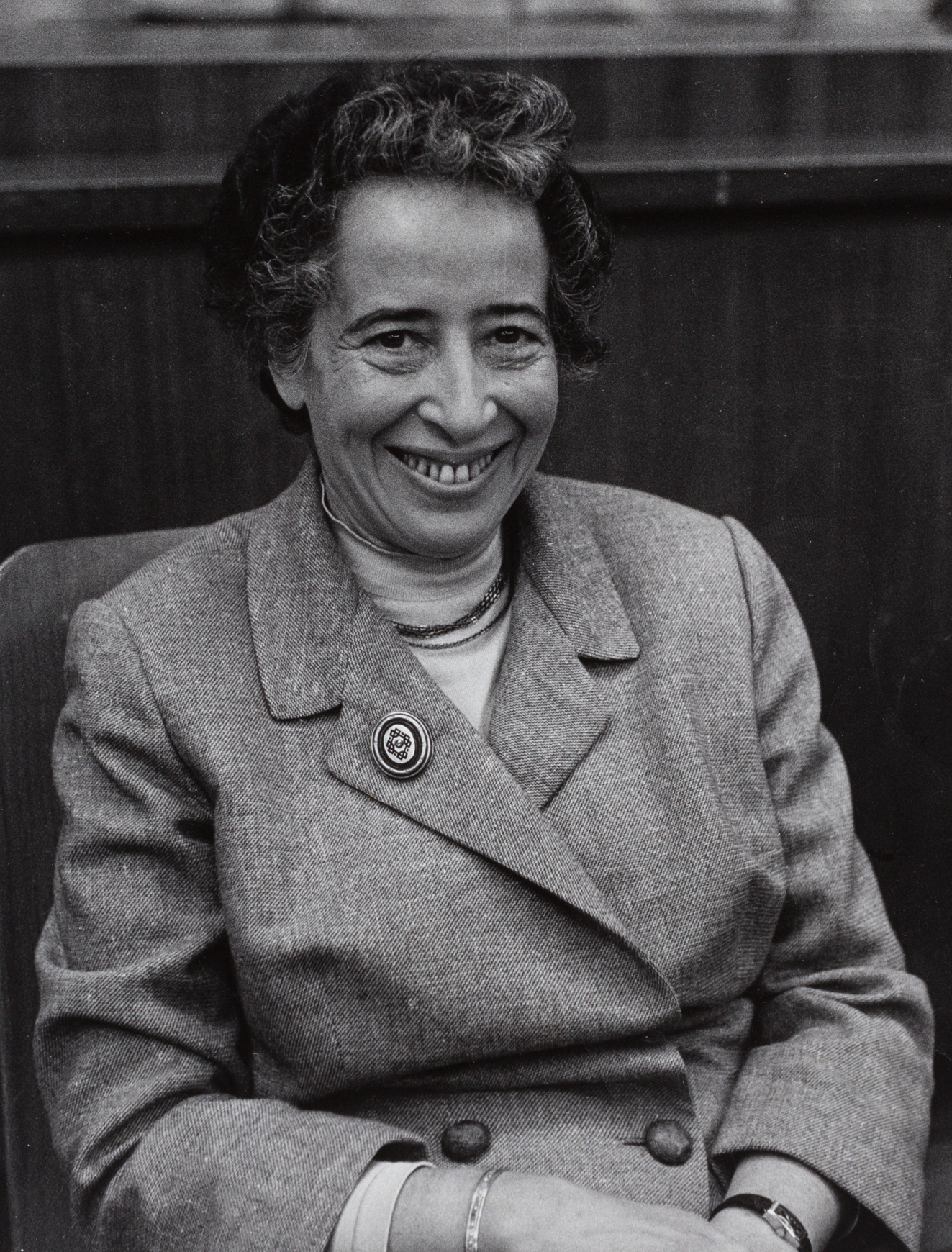
Hannah Arendt, 1958

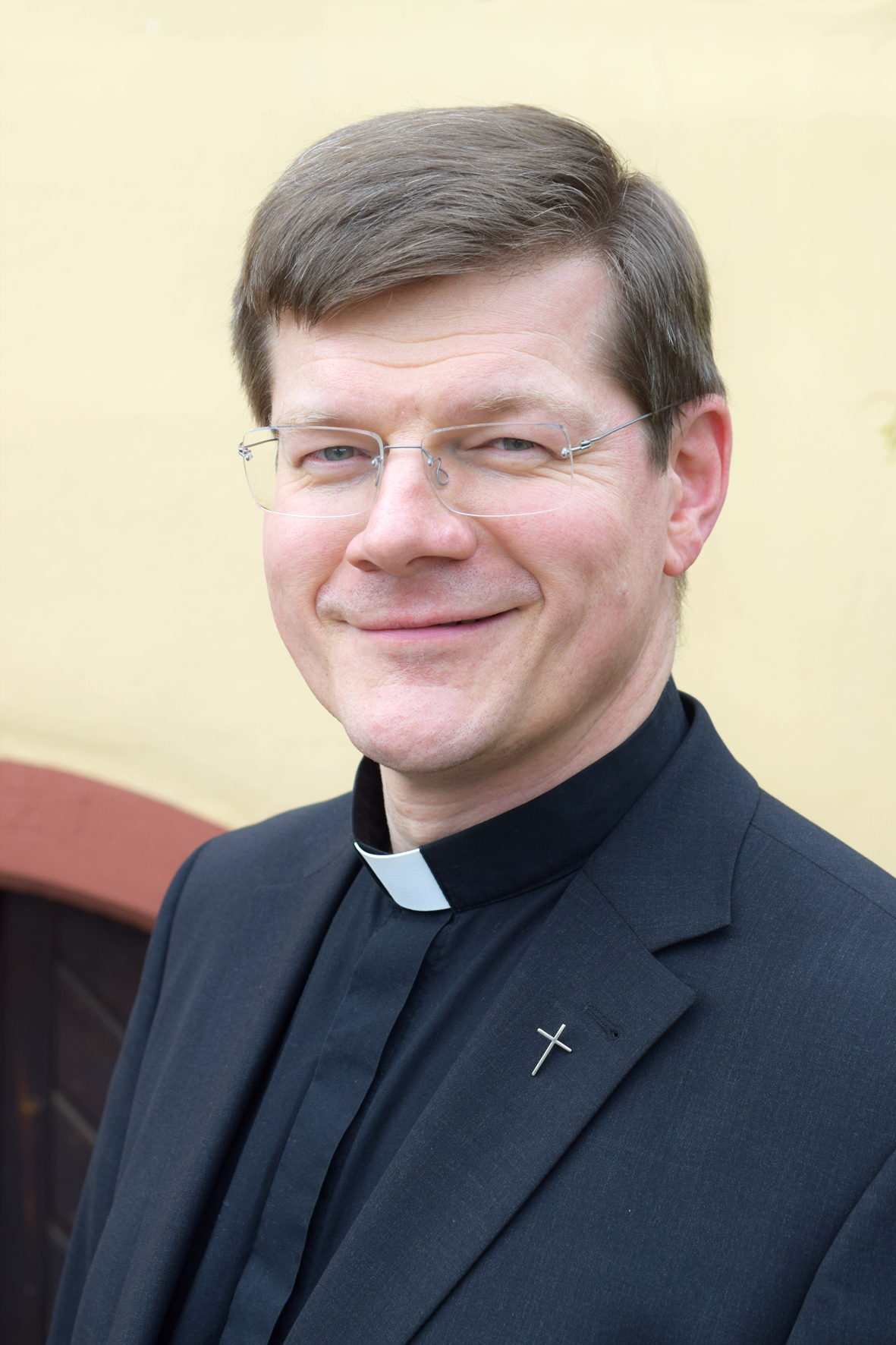
Stephan Burger, 2014

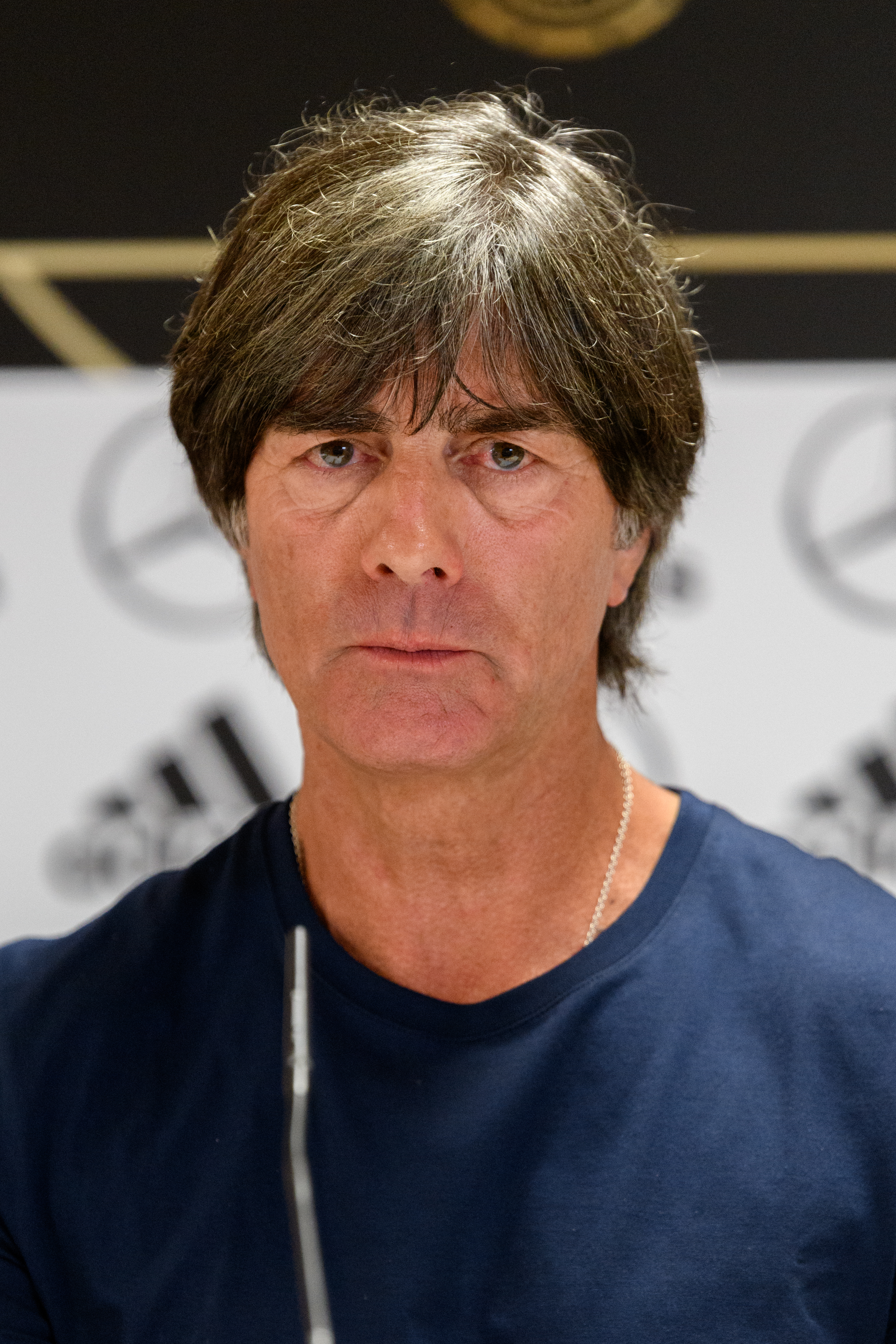
Joachim Löw, 2018

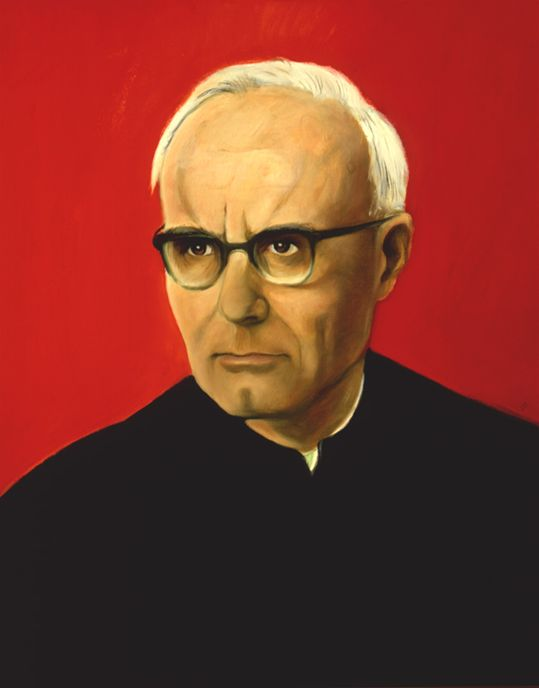
Portrait of Karl Rahner, 2011

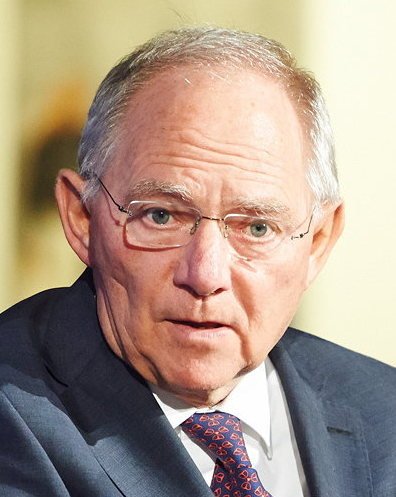
Wolfgang Schäuble, 2014

- Wolfram Aichele (1924–2016), artist
- Hannah Arendt (1906–1975), political theorist
- Jürgen Aschoff (1913–1998), physician, biologist and behavioral physiologist, co-founded chronobiology
- Hans Bender (1907–1991), lecturer on parapsychology
- Nikolaus Brender (born 1949), journalist
- Johannes Boesiger (born 1962), scriptwriter and producer
- Alexander Bonde (born 1975) in the Bundestag for Alliance '90/The Greens 2002 to 2011
- Borwin, Duke of Mecklenburg (born 1956), head of the House of Mecklenburg
- Stephan Burger (born 1962), Roman Catholic clergyman, Archbishop of Freiburg since 2014
- Hoimar von Ditfurth (1921–1989), physician
- Mohamed Dräger (born 1996), German-Tunisian professional footballer
- Peter Dreher (1932-2020), painter
- Martin Egel (born 1944), bass-baritone in opera and concert
- Hedy Epstein (1924–2016), Holocaust refugee and political activist
- Anna Ewers (born 1993), fashion model from Freiburg
- Georg Gädker (born 1981), operatic baritone
- Heiner Garg (born 1966), politician (FDP)
- Miriam Gebhardt (born 1962), historian and writer
- Svetlana Geier (1923–2010), translator
- Michael Glatthaar (born 1953), medieval scholar
- Barbara Goette (1908-1997), multiple courses and multiple jobs.
- Katharina Grosse (born 1961), contemporary artist
- Heinrich Haussler (born 1984), professional cyclist Cervelo TestTeam
- Dany Heatley (born 1981), former professional ice hockey winger
- Peter W. Heller (born 1957), former Deputy Mayor of Freiburg, environmental scientist and venture philanthropist
- Thomas Hengelbrock (born 1958), violinist, musicologist and conductor; co-founded the Freiburger Barockorchester
- Andreas Holschneider (1931–2019), music historian
- Waldemar Hoven (1903–1948), Nazi physician executed for war crimes
- Tobias Hug (1976–2020), a cappella singer
- Marie-Laurence Jungfleisch (born 1990), high-jump athlete
- Walter Kaufmann (1921–1980), philosopher, translator and poet
- Fritz Keller (born 1957), football administrator
- Boris Kodjoe (born 1973), U.S.based model and actor
- Georges Jean Franz Köhler (1946–1995), geneticist
- Benjamin Lebert (born 1982), author and newspaper columnist
- Joachim Löw (born 1960), coach of the Germany national football team from 2006 to 2021
- Michael Leuschner (born 1948), classical pianist and professor of piano at the Hochschule für Musik Freiburg
- Hanns Ludin (1905–1947), Nazi diplomat executed for war crimes
- Andreas Lutz (born 1981), media artist analyzes perception versus reality
- Christoph von Marschall (born 1959), journalist
- Christian Meyer (born 1969), track cyclist and gold medallist at the 1992 Summer Olympics
- Michael Nehls (born 1962), medical doctor, author, and former cyclist
- Herbert Niebling (1905–1966), master designer of lace knitting
- Paul Pietsch (1911–2012), racing driver, journalist and publisher of Das Auto
- Karl Rahner SJ (1904–1984), Jesuit priest and influential Roman Catholic theologian
- Dieter Salomon (born 1960), Alliance '90/The Greens politician, Mayor of Freiburg until 2018
- Wolfgang Schäuble (1942–2023), CDU politician
- Jürgen E. Schrempp (born 1944), former head of DaimlerChrysler
- Angelika Schrobsdorff (1927–2016), writer and actress
- Til Schweiger (born 1963), actor and director
- Klaus Tschira (1940–2015), entrepreneur
- Bernhard Witkop (1917–2010), organic chemist
- Johannes Fechner (born 1972), politician
- Joana Zimmer (born 1979), blind pop singer
- Nate Wilbourne (born 2008), Youth and Environmental Advocate, student at UWC Robert Bosch College

== Gallery ==
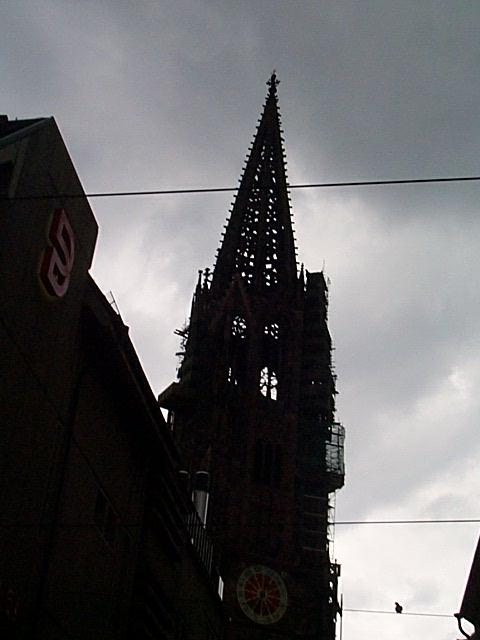
Freiburg Minster

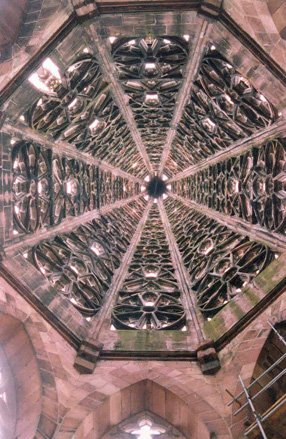
Inside the belfry of Freiburg Minster

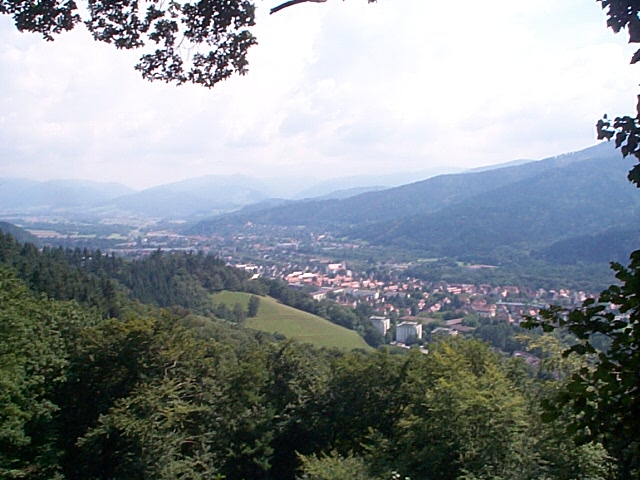
Landscape from the Schlossberg Tower

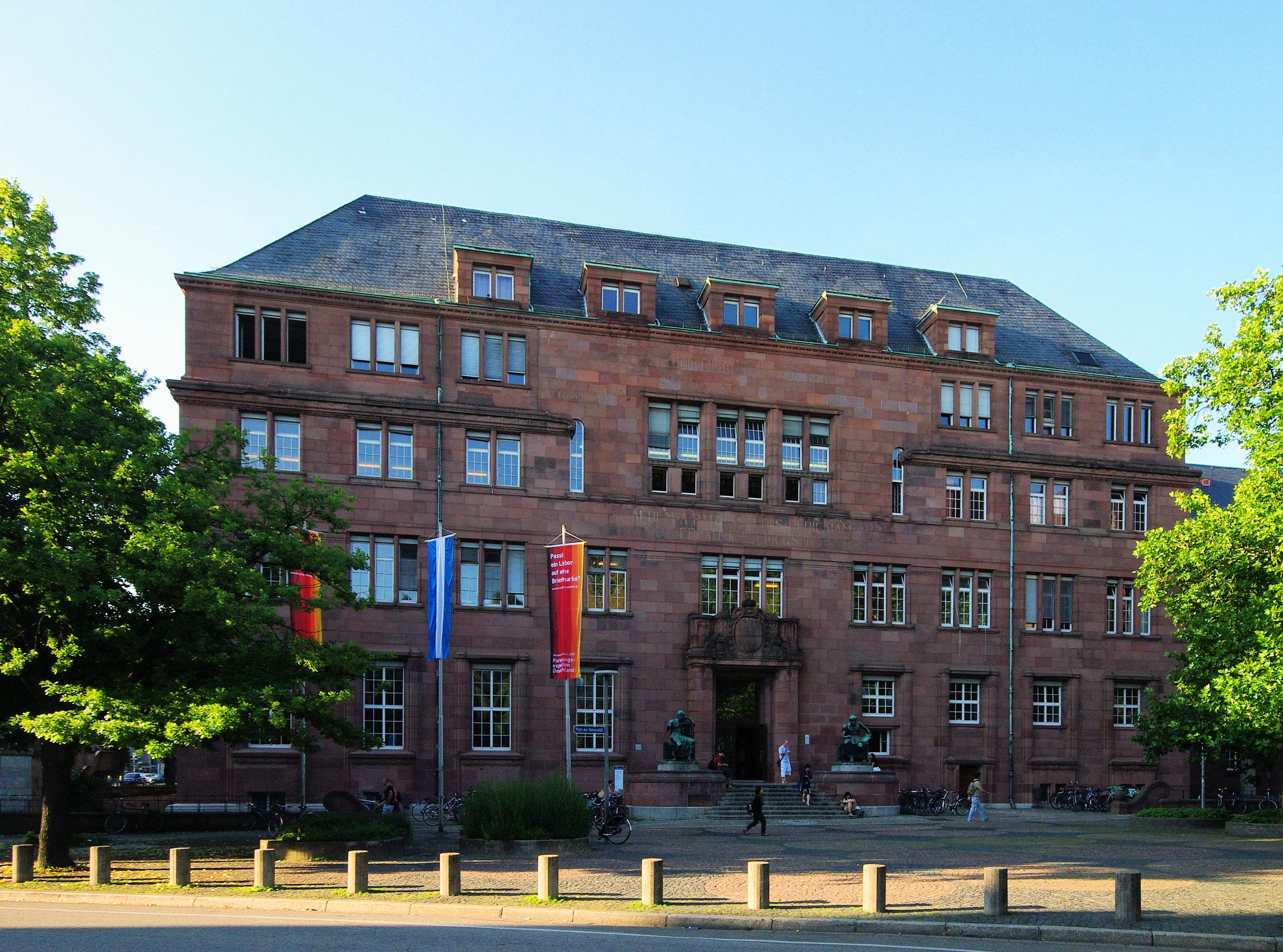
University of Freiburg

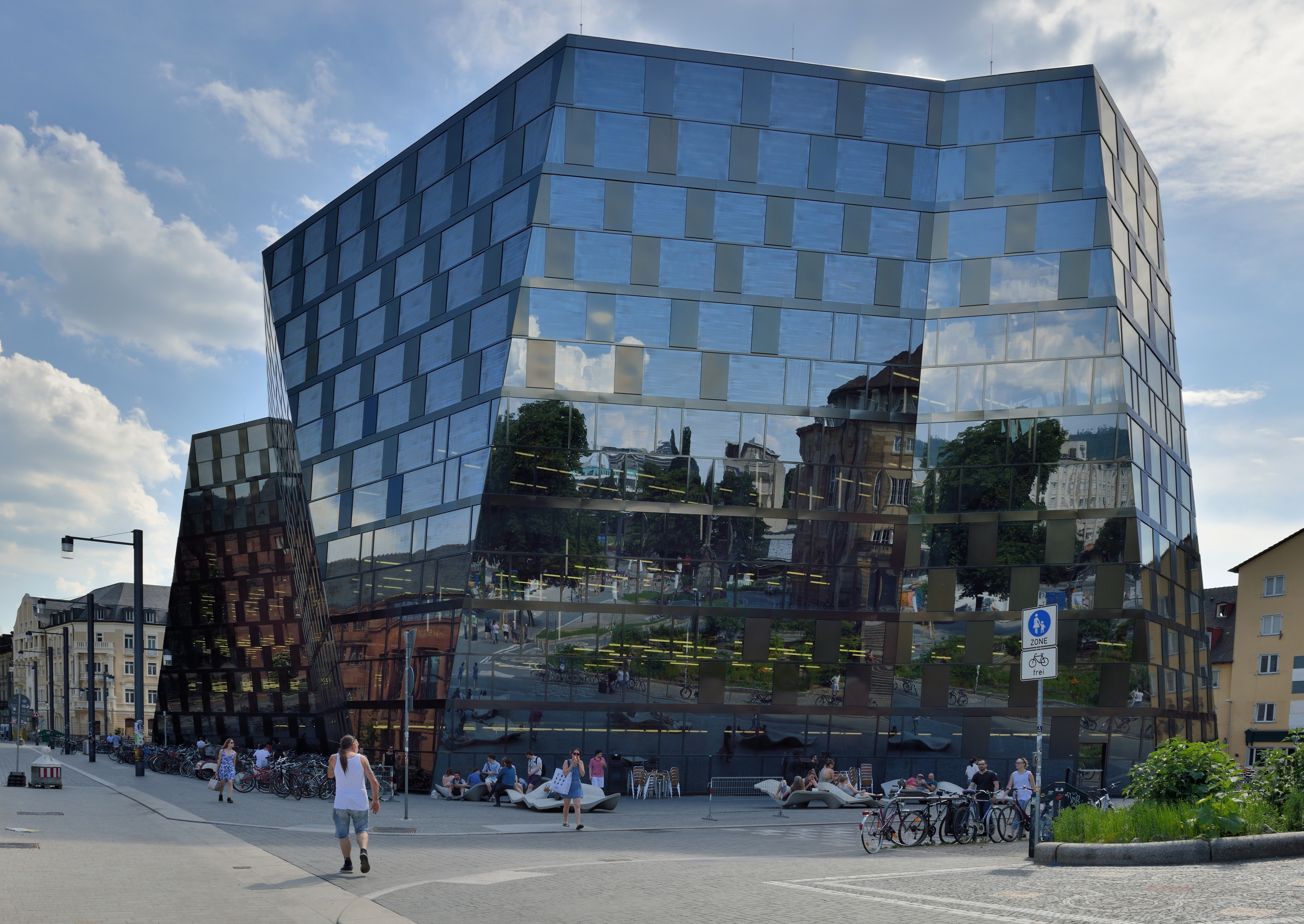
University Library Freiburg

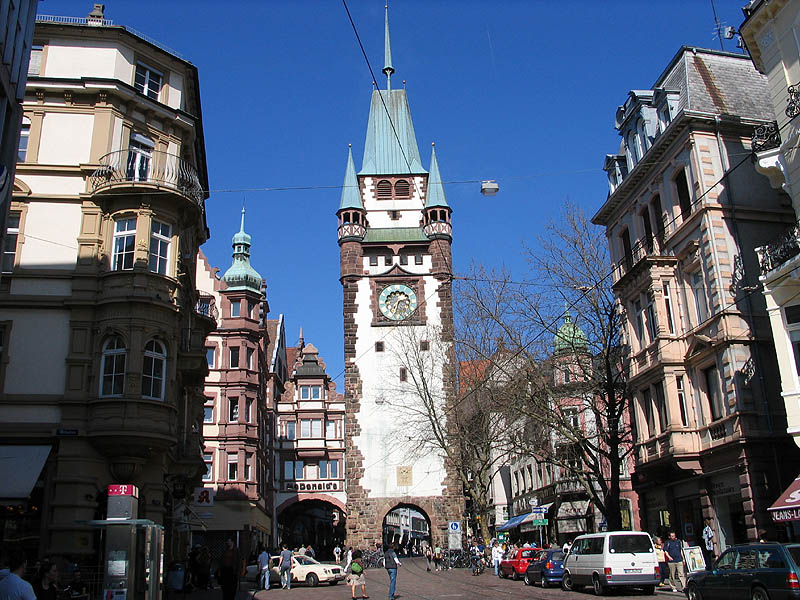
Martinstor

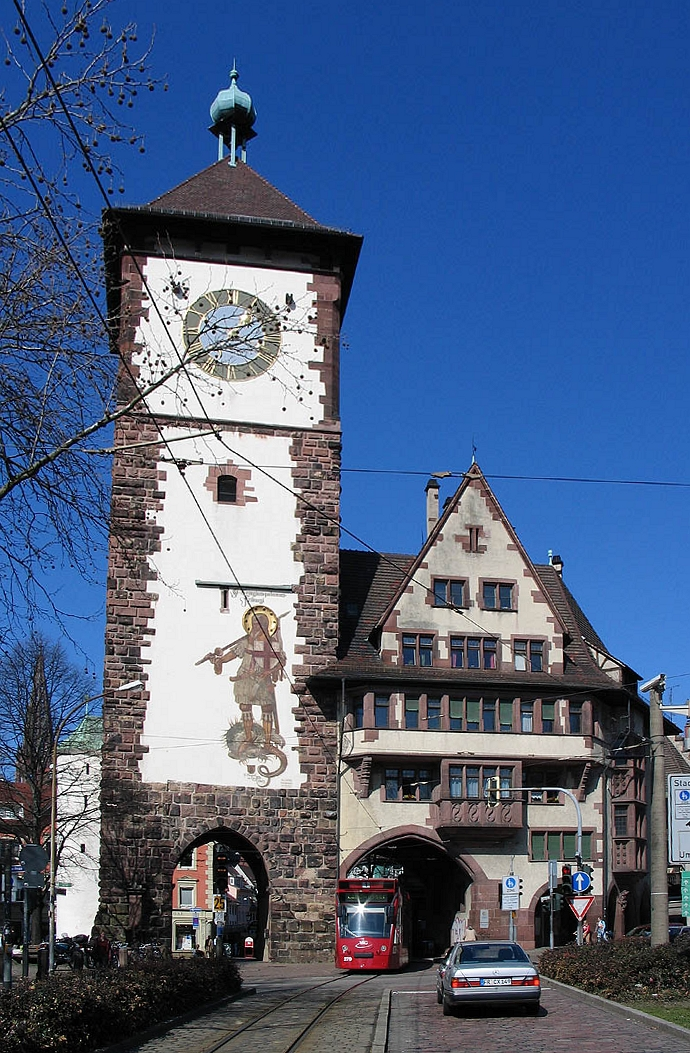
The Schwabentor

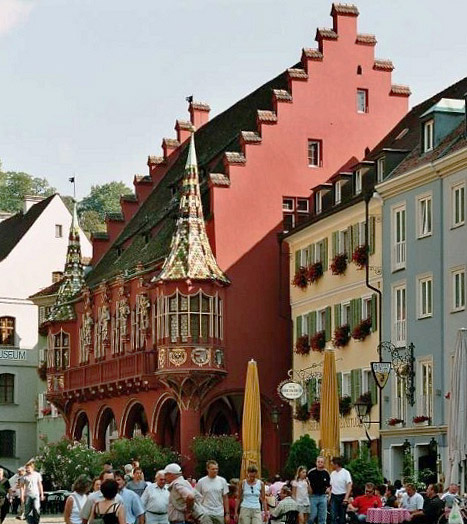
Historic Merchants Hall at the Münsterplatz

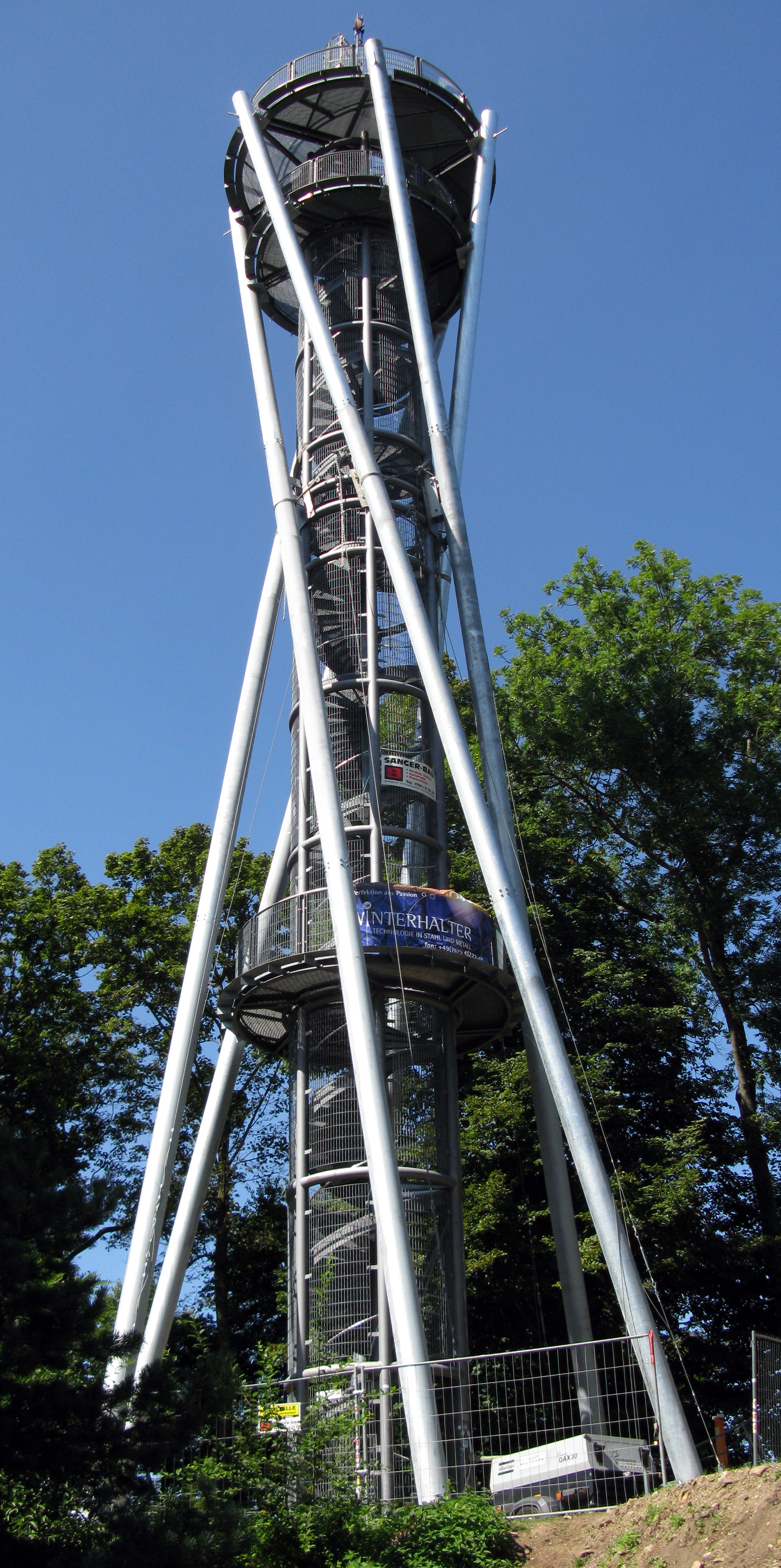
Schlossberg Tower

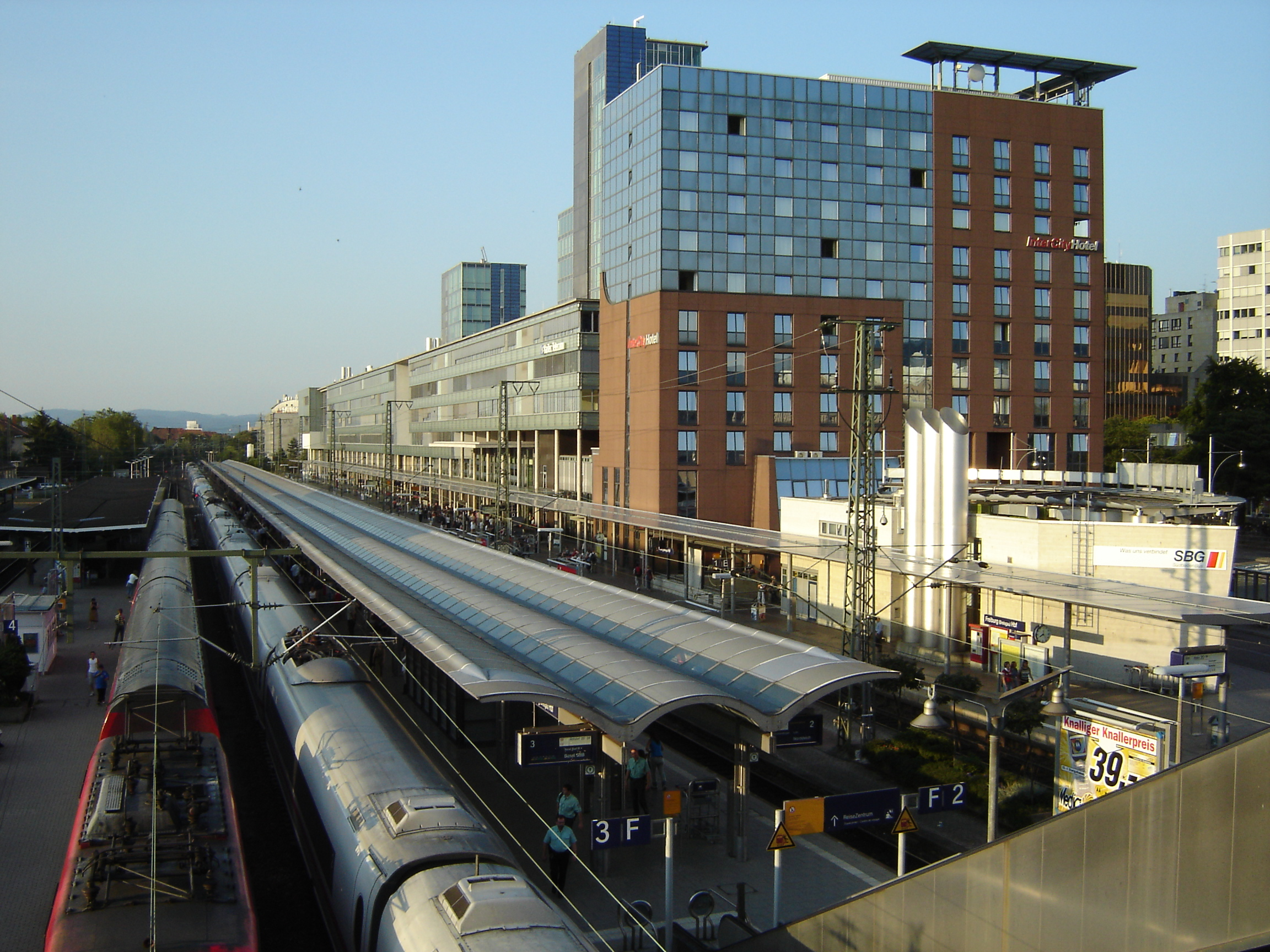
Main railway station

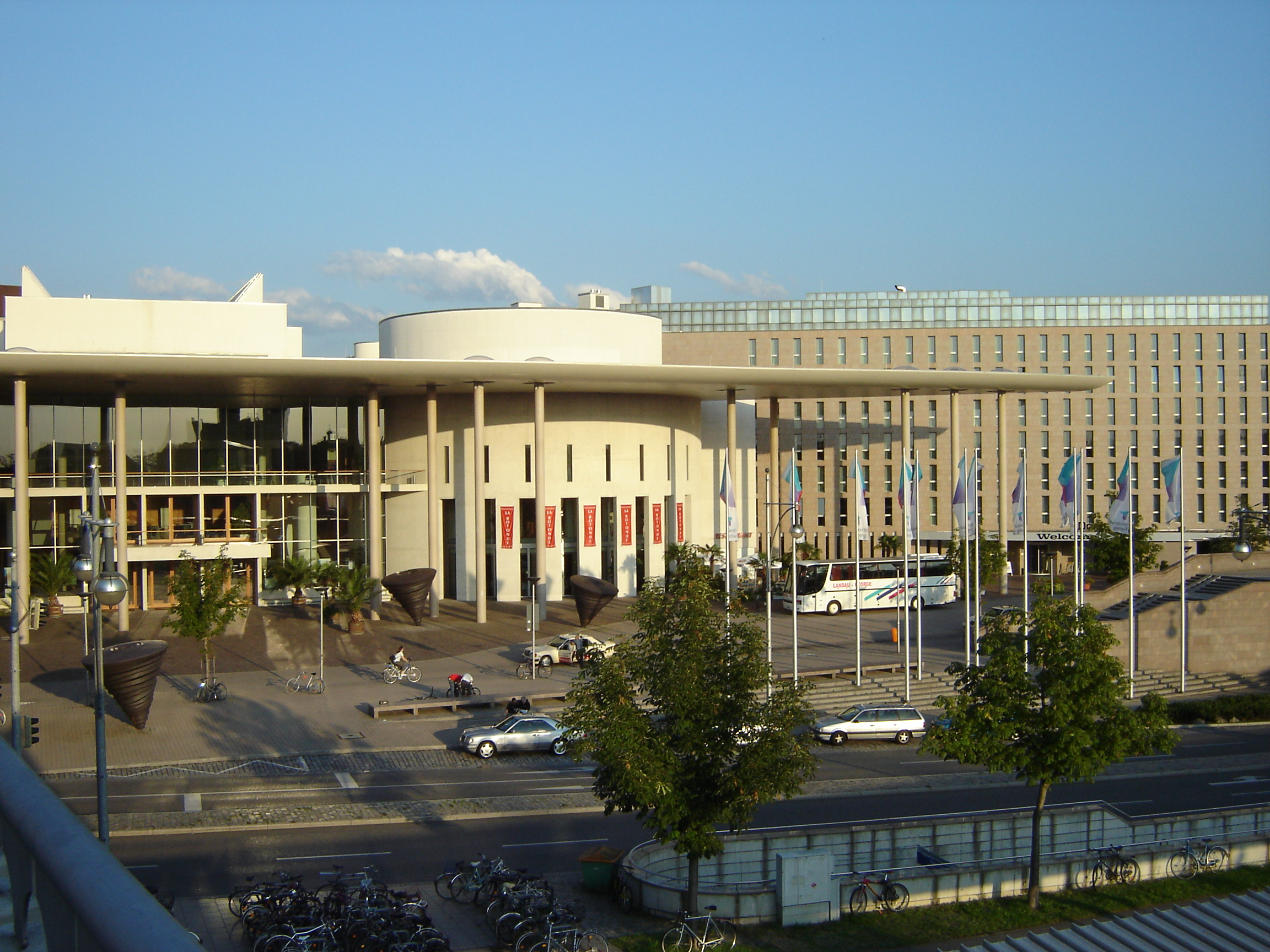
The concert hall

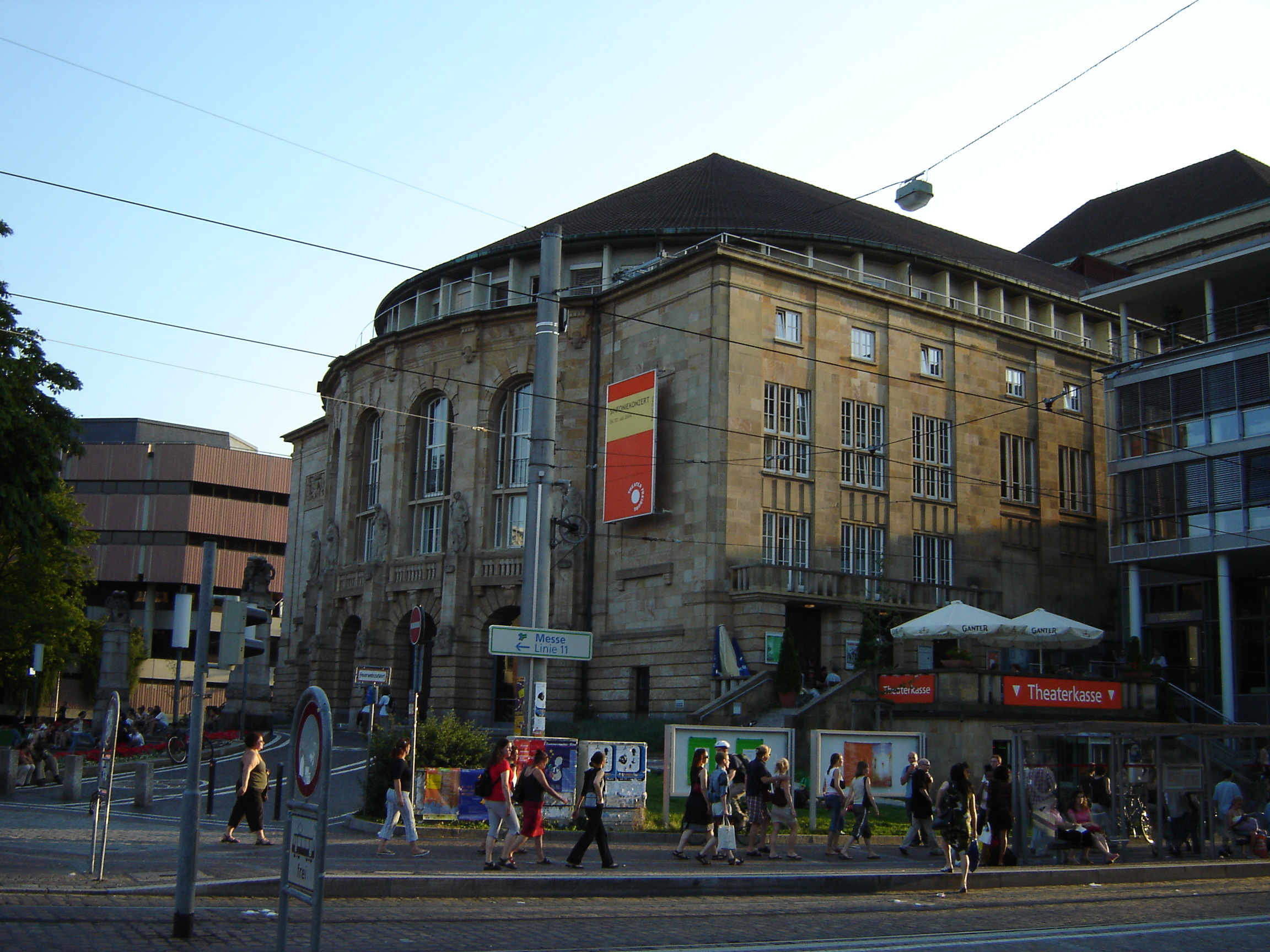
Stadttheater

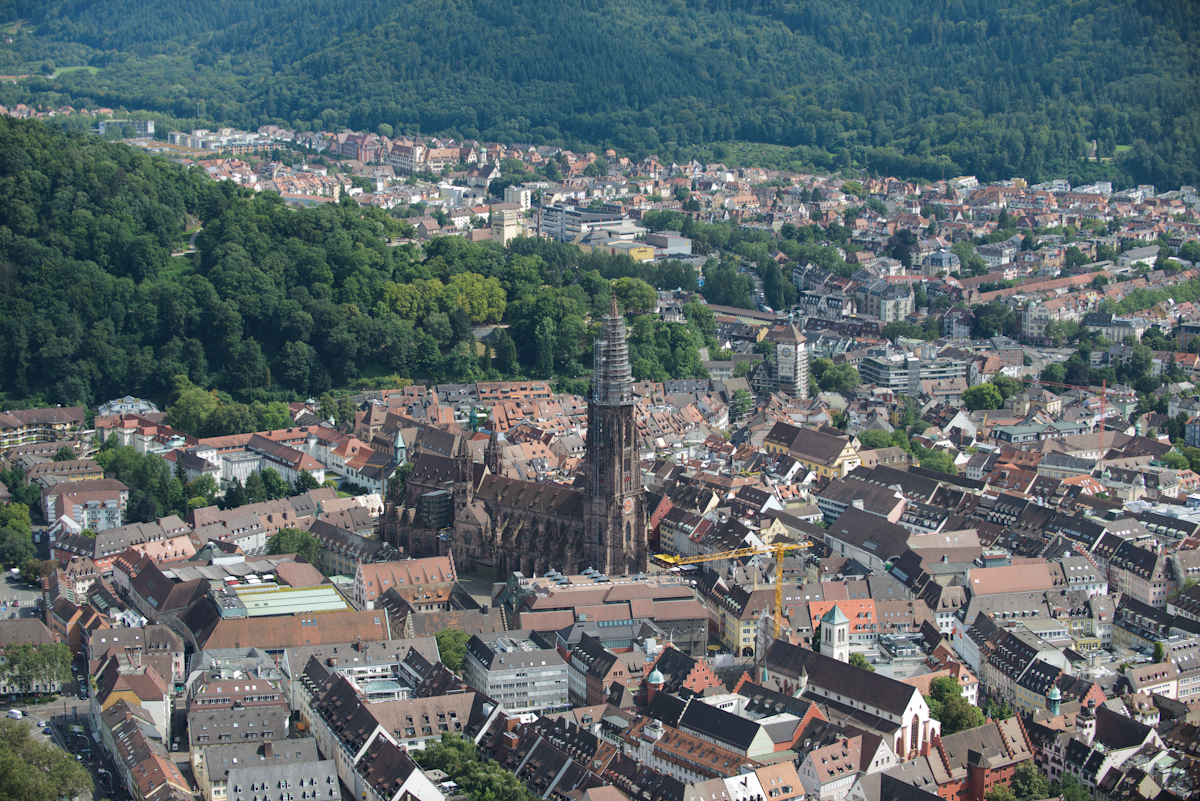
View of Freiburg

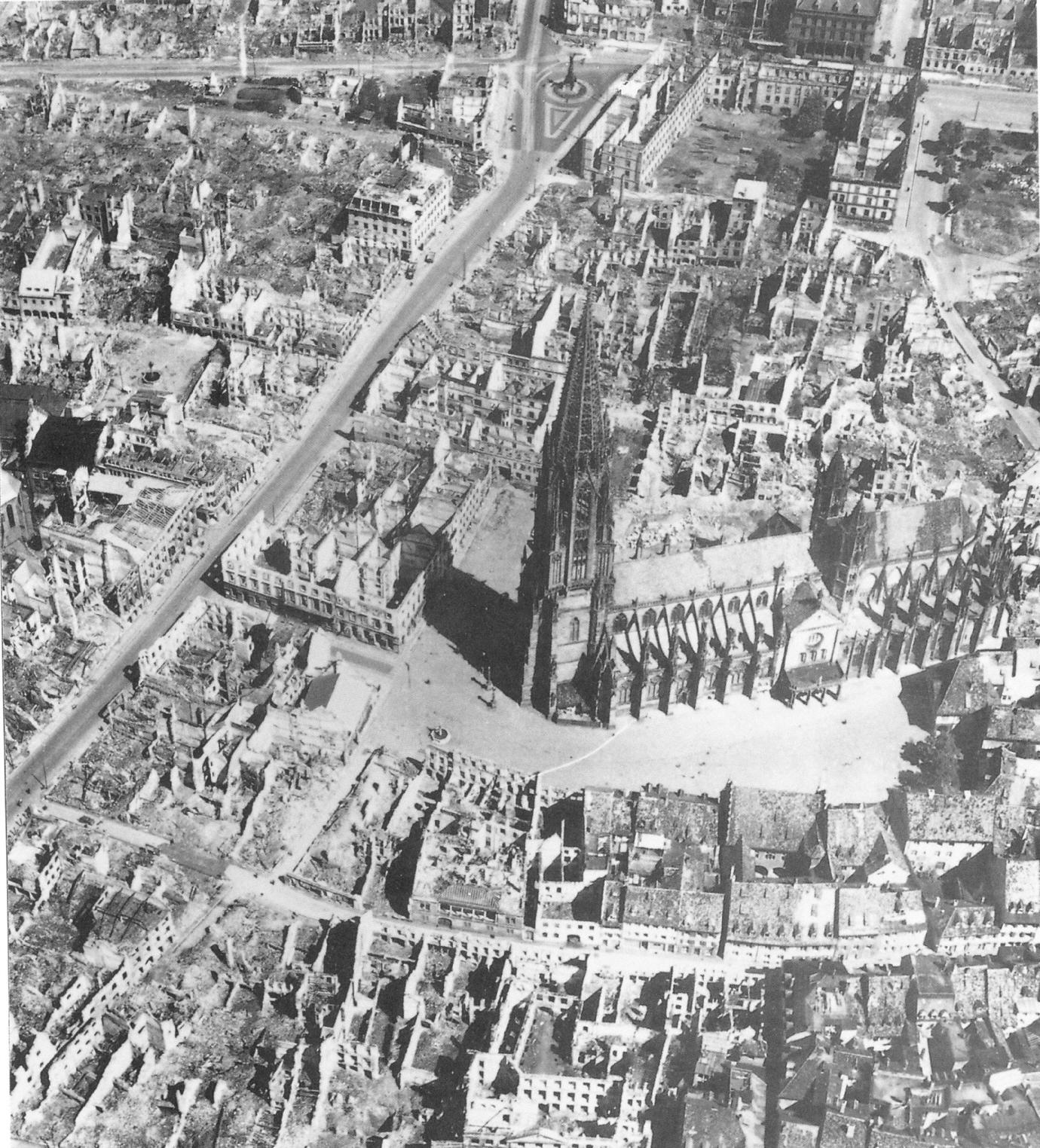
Freiburg 1944

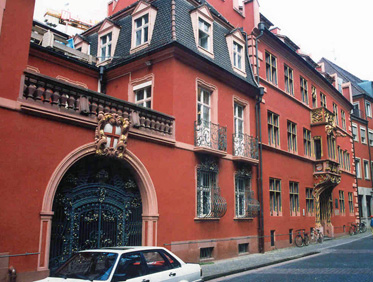
The Whale House

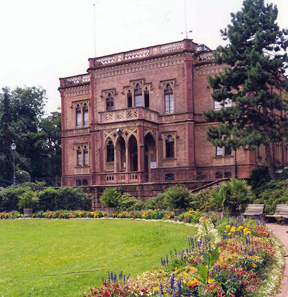
Colombi Palace Museum

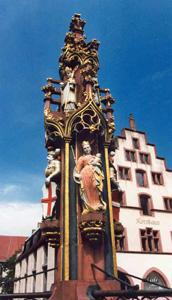
Fish Fountain

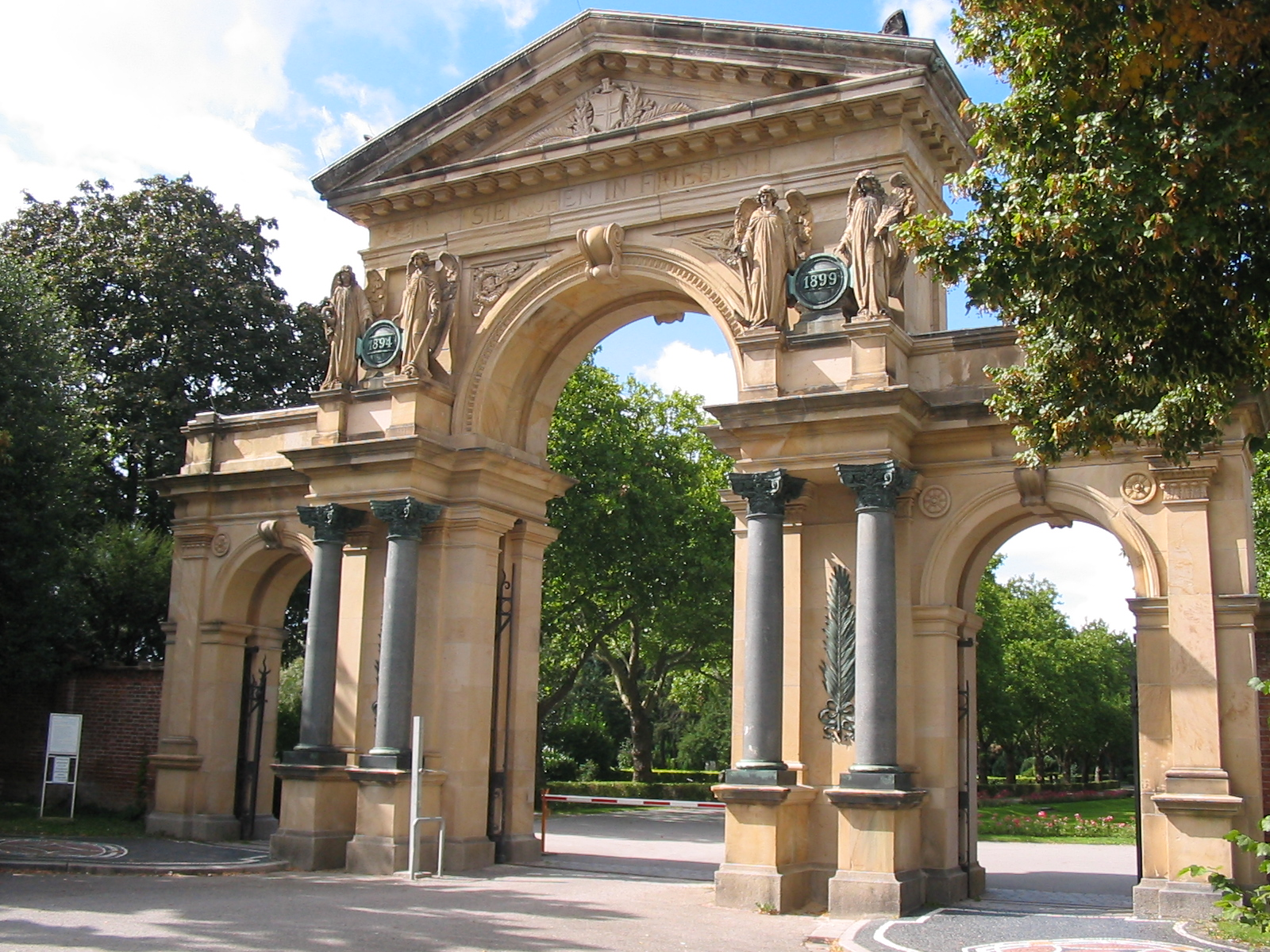
Main cemetery Freiburg

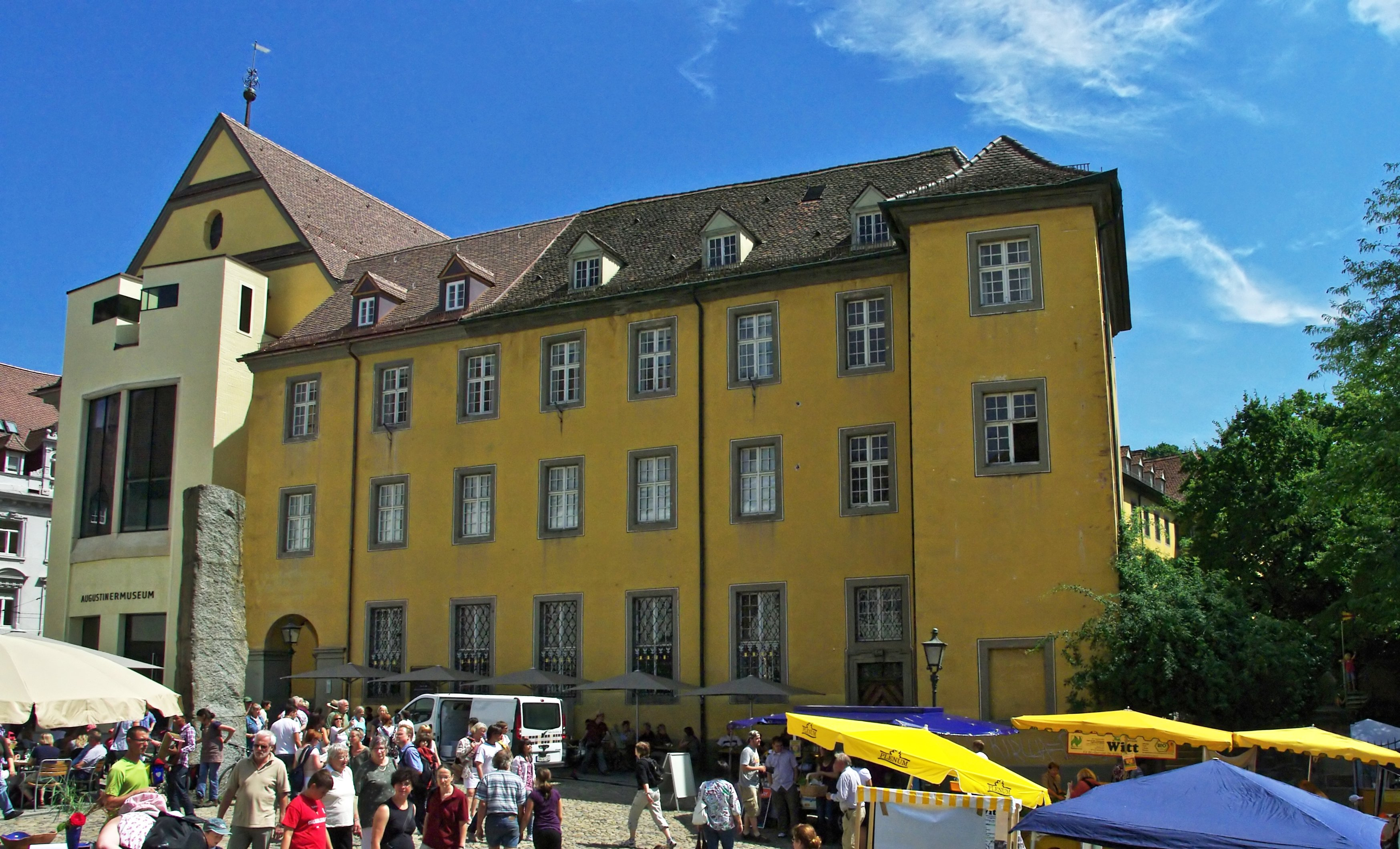
Augustiner Museum

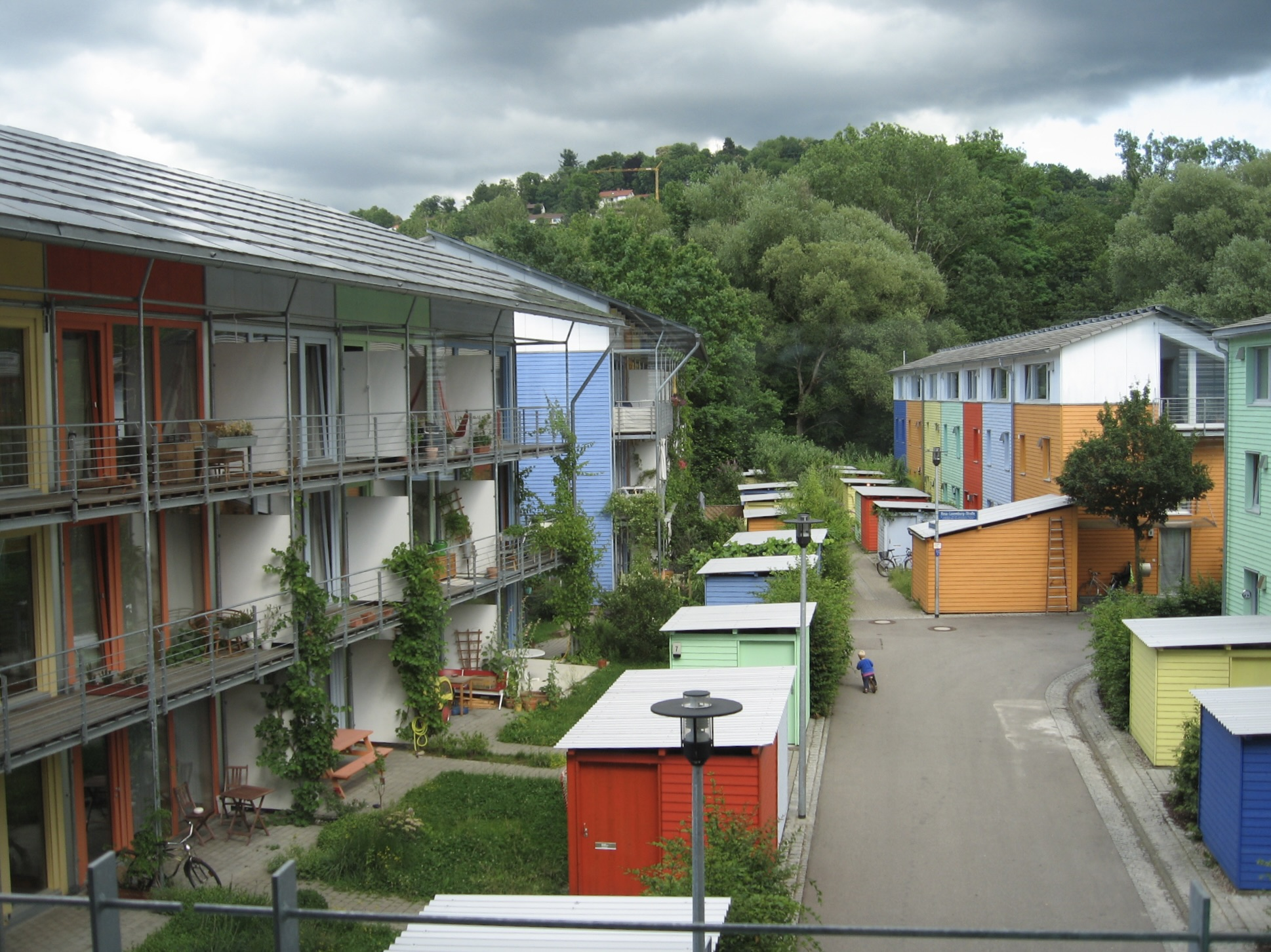
Vauban, Freiburg, a sustainable model district
