= Hermann Thomaschek =

German opera siger

Hermann Thomaschek (13 April 1824 – 11 December 1910) was a German operatic bass.

== Life ==
Born in Czerniki, East Prussia, as Sohn eines evangelischen Pfarrers studierte Thomaschek an der Albertus-Universität Königsberg Theologie und Philologie. 1846 wurde er Mitglied der Königsberger Senioren-Convent. Won for singing by Eduard Mantius in 1847, he was trained by Franz Hauser in Munich. He had his first stage appearance in 1849 in Danzig in the Theater am Kohlenmarkt. It followed annually changing engagements: Hoftheater Sondershausen (1849/50), Mainfranken Theater Würzburg. (1850/51), Barfüsserkloster Zurich (1851/52), Volkstheater Rostock (1852/53), Staatstheater Kassel (1853/54), Deutsche Oper Amsterdam (1854/55), Theater Görlitz (1855/56) and Szczecin City Theatre (1856/57). With a Wanderbühne, he was in Lausanne and Chambéry in 1857/58. Then he found firm engagements in Theater Lübeck. (1858/59), at the Staatstheater Nürnberg, at the Salzburger Landestheater (1861/62) and at the Theater Basel (1862/63). After he had worked in 1864/65 at Stralsund Theatre had been a singer and director, he went even further north in 1865/66, to the new (German) Latvian National Opera. After one year at the Landestheater Neustrelitz, he went to the Theater Trier as singer and director (1867/68), the Landestheater Detmold (1868/69), the Theater Chemnitz (1869/70) and the Grand Theatre, Poznań (1870/71). After the Proclamation of the German Empire, he came to the Landestheater Altenburg. In 1873/74, he sang at the Stadttheater Freiburg in the Augustinian Monastery, Freiburg, in the following season at the Stadttheater Magdeburg. He then lived in Chemnitz where his wife Luise Schmidt (1829–1887) was a singing teacher. Thomascheck won another engagement at the Sondershausen (1877/78) and in Trier (1878/79). He changed into a Bassbuffo and had his last performances in the Year of the Three Emperors. For many years, he was engaged in vocal pedagogy. He spent his 23 years as a widower in a home for needy stage artists, which Marie Seebach had donated in Weimar in her will.

Thomaschek died in Weimar at the age of 86.

== Roles ==
- Il Commendatore in Don Giovanni
- Oroveso in Norma
- Giorgio in I puritani
- Gaveston in La dame blanche
- Marcel in Les Huguenots
- Sarastro in Die Zauberflöte
- Kaspar in Der Freischütz
- Landgraf in Tannhäus
