= Littenweiler =

- Stadtteil of Freiburg im Breisgau
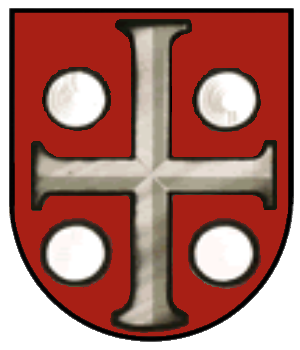
- Coat of arms

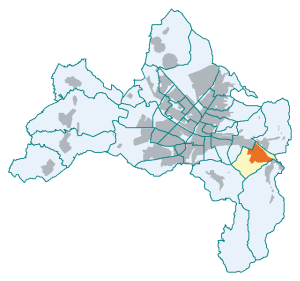
- Location within Freiburg
- Interactive map of Littenweiler
- Location within Germany Location within Baden-Württemberg
- Coordinates: 47°58′46″N 7°53′48″E
- Country: Germany
- State: Baden-Württemberg
- City: Freiburg im Breisgau

Area
  - Total: 4.12 km^{2} (1.59 sq mi)
- Elevation: 318 m (1,043 ft)

Population (2020-12-31)
  - Total: 8,138
  - Density: 1,980/km^{2} (5,120/sq mi)
- Time zone: UTC+01:00 (CET)
  - Summer (DST): UTC+02:00 (CEST)
- Postal codes: 79117
- Dialling codes: 0761

Littenweiler (German pronunciation: [ˈlɪtn̩vaɪlɐ]) is a quarter (Stadtteil) in the south-east of Freiburg im Breisgau near the river Dreisam in the Dreisam valley. The station building of the stopping point Freiburg-Littenweiler lies 318 m (1,043 ft) above sea level.

== History ==
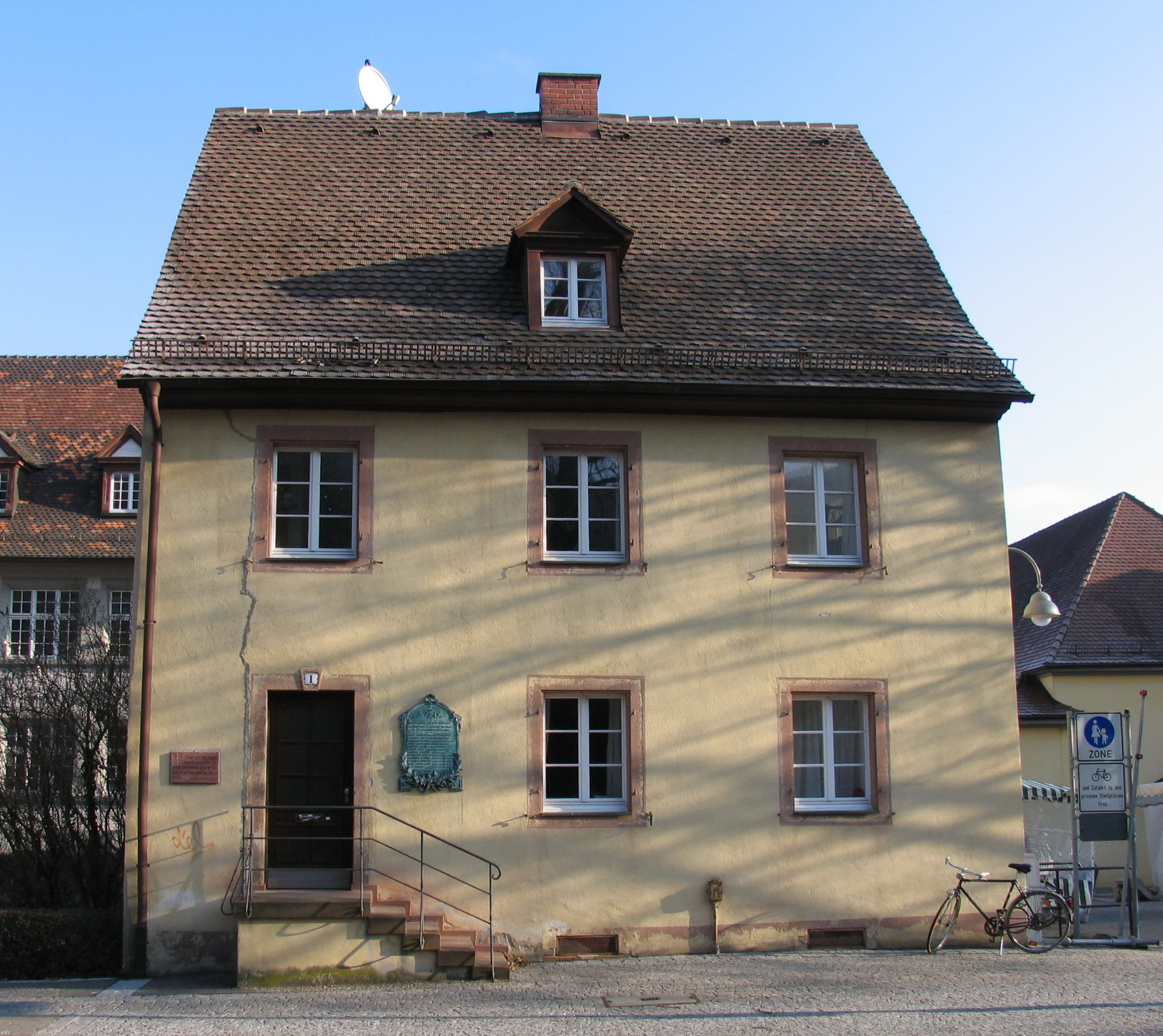
House built in 1817 in the village square, town hall from 1846 to 1913

The village Littenweiler is mentioned for the first time in the 11th century as "Lutenwile" in a document of the Einsiedeln monastery. It has been a farming village located Eastern of the city of Freiburg at the edge of the Black Forest, where the Dreisam valley opens up to the Zartener basin in the East. Because the village’s church is dedicated to Saint Barbara the patron of miners, it can be assumed that miners lived in Littenweiler, who along with the residents of the neighbouring village Kappel (Freiburg im Breisgau) worked in the tunnels of the Schauinsland (called "Erzkasten"). After various property situations, the village was divided in 1560 into two districts: one district belonging to the lords of the House of Sickingen and the other district belonging to the Teutonic Order of Freiburg. In 1614, these local lords concluded a contract, which organised the reciprocal interests as for example jurisdiction and taxes.

Despite its incorporation into Freiburg in 1914 the character of the farmer’s village at the gates of the city hadn’t changed much until the middle of the 20th century, even though the modern world found its way into it with the construction of the Höllentalbahn (Black Forest) in 1887, a rail station and the tram in 1925. In the middle of the 1950s the high population growth of Freiburg impacted the development of this district (1950: 2.132 inhabitants, 1961: 4.735 inhabitants, 1970: 6.826 inhabitants): huge building sites were developed, a new parish church in honour of Saint Barbara was built (the old one became a community hall) as well as the Evangelic Ascension church and the University of Education was established on the fields between the railway line and the old centre of the village. The placid village with a few mansions along the sides of the mountain became a large municipal residential quarter for a predominantly middle-class population, which grew together with the neighbouring districts Waldsee, Ebnet and Kappel.

== Coat of arms ==
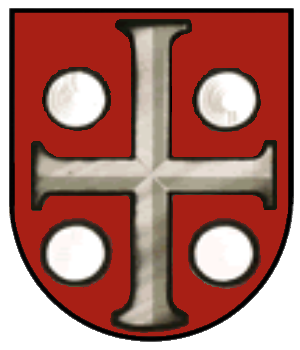
The village’s coat of arms shows a white cross pattée on a red background. In each of the four consequentially built sections is a silver bullet. It is a combination of the coats of arms of the long-time local lords of the German Order (cross) and the count of Sickingen (silver bullets).

== Transport ==
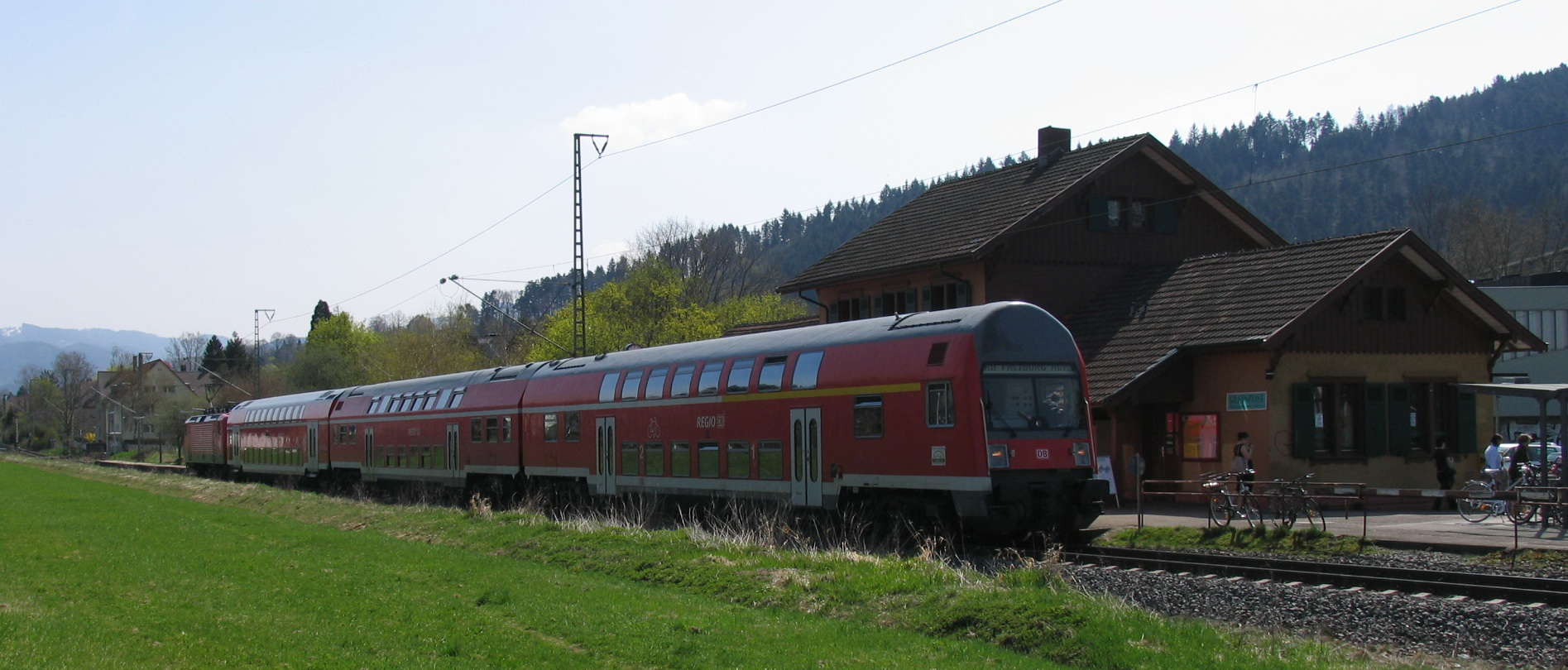
The Höllentalbahn (a train) connects Littenweiler every half hour to Freiburg.

The district has very good transport connections. Because of the Eastern part of the B 31, which mainly runs through a tunnel under Littenweiler, the congestion was reduced and simultaneously created a fast connection to the city centre and the Black Forest with its exit at the Eastern outskirts. The main connection to the city centre is the Hansjakobstraße on which the tramline runs as well. Additionally, the Höllentalbahn (Black Forest) approaches the station Freiburg-Littenweiler every half hour and coming from the central station traverses the whole Höllental up to Titisee-Neustadt thus being the most important public transport for commuters, tourists and winter sportsmen in the region. The terminal station of tram line 1 in Freiburg, the highest frequented line of the Freiburger Verkehrs AG, links Littenweiler to the network of the local public transport. At the tram's endpoint, bus lines operate to the districts Ebnet and Kappel.

== Infrastructure ==
Especially with the newly built shopping centre "ZO" (Zentrum Oberwiehre) new shopping possibilities were given to the citizens of Littenweiler. Although it lies outside Littenweiler in the nearby district Oberwiehre, it can be reached easily by the Hansjakobstraße and with the tram line 1. Relatively few shops are located in Littenweiler, there is only a small centre nearby the tram's terminal station "Lassbergstraße" and near the border of the neighbouring district Waldsee. The proper village centre around the former church, the former town hall and the schoolhouse of the Reinhold Schneider school is widely freed from transit traffic today. The Catholic church St. Barbara, a new building from the 1960s, is located in the district next to the old church in the village centre, which is used as village hall nowadays, and the Evangelical Ascension church, a modern concrete building with a characteristic bell tower. On the southern edge of the district lies the "Waldhof", an independent institution of the free adult education and professional development. The St. Anthony retirement home in Freiburg-Littenweiler is supervised by the Franciscan nuns of Gengenbach. It is a stationary care facility in a former spa and bathhouse, which was built around 1844 near a healing mineral spring. A separate, small, today seldom used, local cemetery indicates a history of the district as a former independent village. During the 1960s, the new "Bergäcker" cemetery was built on the area south of the Höllentalbahn in the south-west of the district, which became available for burials from all over the village. In 2007 a small part of it was sectioned off for a pet cemetery.

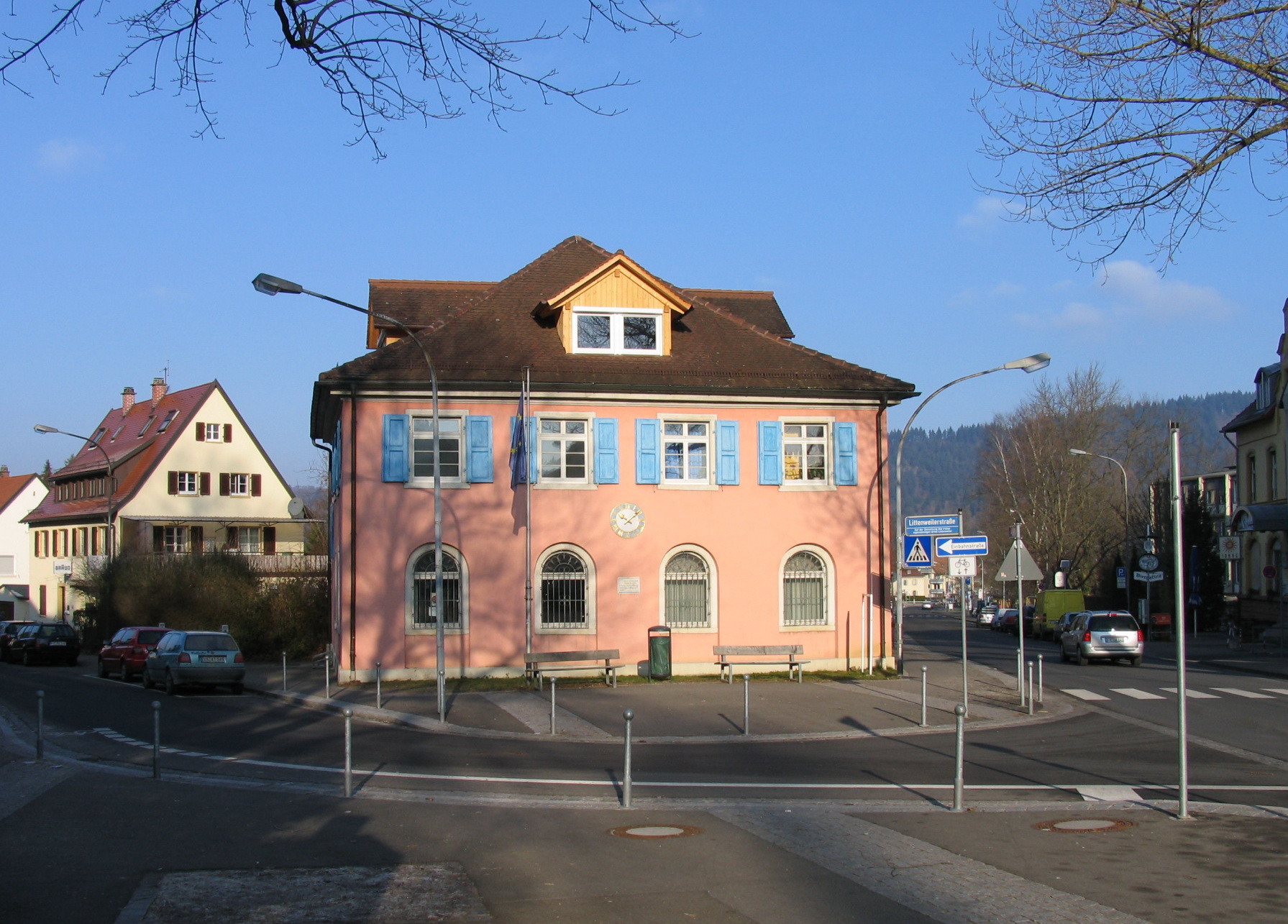
Built in 1870 as the second school in Littenweiler and used as a school until 1925, afterwards as a post office

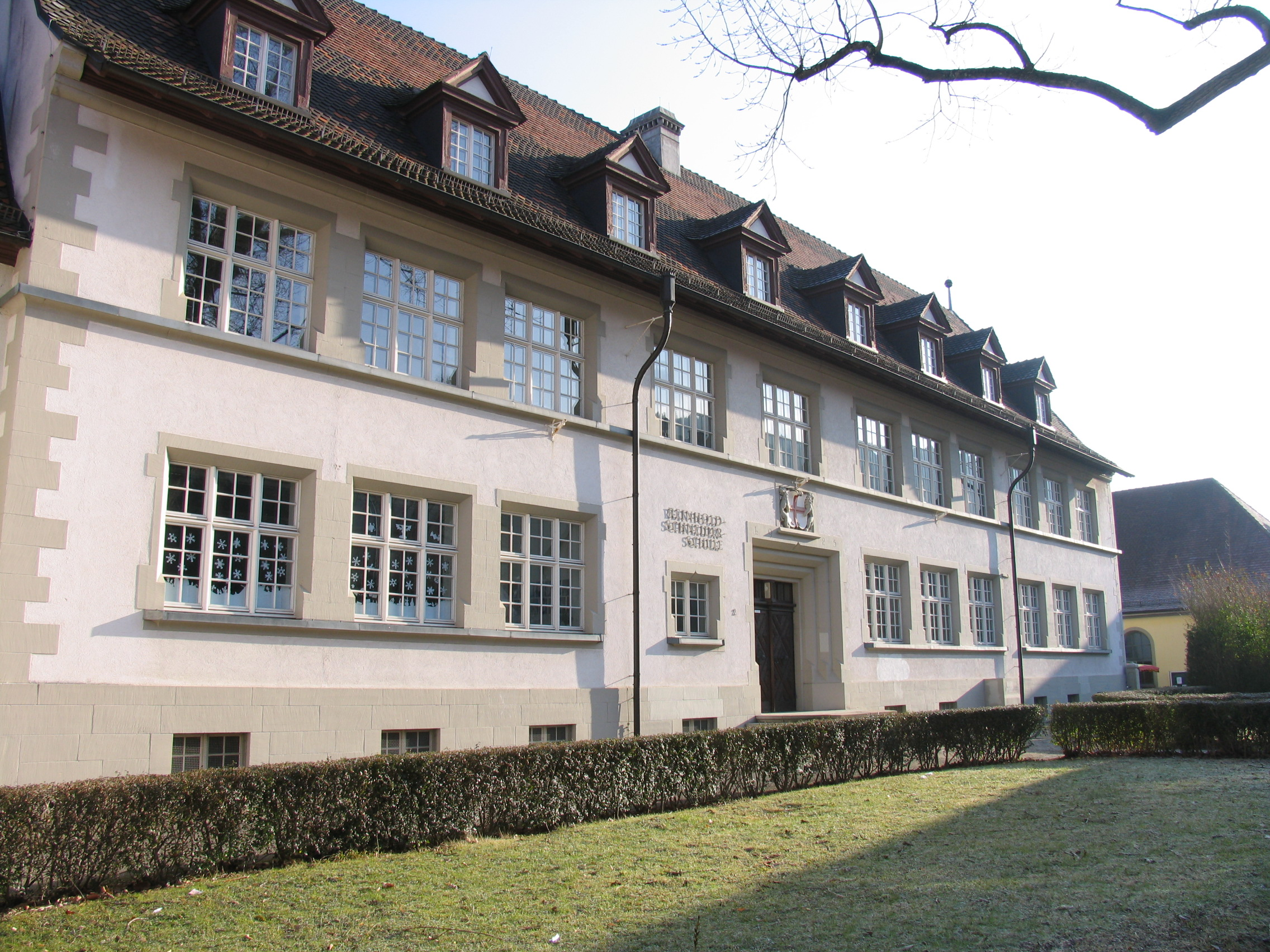
The Reinhold Schneider school

One of the three civic amenity sites of Freiburg is located in Littenweiler, where citizens can dispose of waste of all kinds.

== Education ==
- The University of Education Freiburg grew out of the Teacher Training colleges I and II in 1962, trains teachers for primary and secondary school education and offers courses for graduate teachers. From modest beginnings, a remarkable campus has been built on Lindenmattenstraße.
- The Waldhof Academy for Further Education was founded in 1950 as a free establishment for adult education. Its educational opportunities included seminars and lectures on the themes of humanities and sciences, art, geography and ethnology, religion and philosophy, as well as musical and creative courses.
- The Reinhold Schneider School (primary and secondary school) had to vastly expand in the 1960s due to the huge population increase. It is named after the author Reinhold Schneider, who lived for many years in Freiburg.
- Thanks to the language school for foreign students supported by the Roman Catholic Archdiocese, students from other language regions have been enabled to learn the German language.
- Two large student dormitories, the Thomas More Hostel and the Alban Stolz House, strengthened the link between the district and the universities of the city.

== Sport ==
On the Schwarzwaldstraße, in the neighbouring district of Waldsee, there is a series of major sports grounds belonging to the city of Freiburg. These are also important for Littenweiler and include:

- A lido – Freiburg’s largest open-air swimming pool with a slide of 91 metres in length, directly next to the Schwarzwald-Stadion
- Schwarzwald-Stadion (formerly Dreisam Stadium) – the football ground of SC Freiburg; a little distance away is the Möslestadion with the football academy (which is for SC Freiburg amateur footballers)
- Post-Turn- und Sportverein Jahn (PTSV Jahn), the Jahn gymnastics and sports club – grounds for popular sports
- FT 1844 Freiburg – the largest sports club in southern Baden which has sports facilities including an indoor swimming pool, roller skating rink, tennis courts etc. and a sports nursery and primary school
- Freiburg Tennis Club
- Sports facilities of the University of Freiburg, which are also used by the students of the Pädagogischen Hochschule (University of Education)

== References in Literature ==
The still rural district of Littenweiler is the setting of Christoph Meckel’s autobiographical narrative, "Der Brand". In the novel he describes, amongst other things, the blaze after the bombing of Freiburg on 27 November 1944, which he watched from Eichberg.

== People of interest ==
- Albert Benitz (1904-1979), cinematographer, was born in Littenweiler.
