= Kirzner =

Kirzner is a surname. Notable people with the surname include:

- Israel Kirzner (born 1930), British-born American economist
- Julian Kirzner (born 1976), Australian rules footballer
- Adrián Kirzner Schwartz (born 1968), Argentine actor and media producer better known as Adrián Suar

== See also ==
- Kirner
