= Augustiner Museum =

Museum in Germany

Coordinates: 47°59′38″N 7°51′09″E

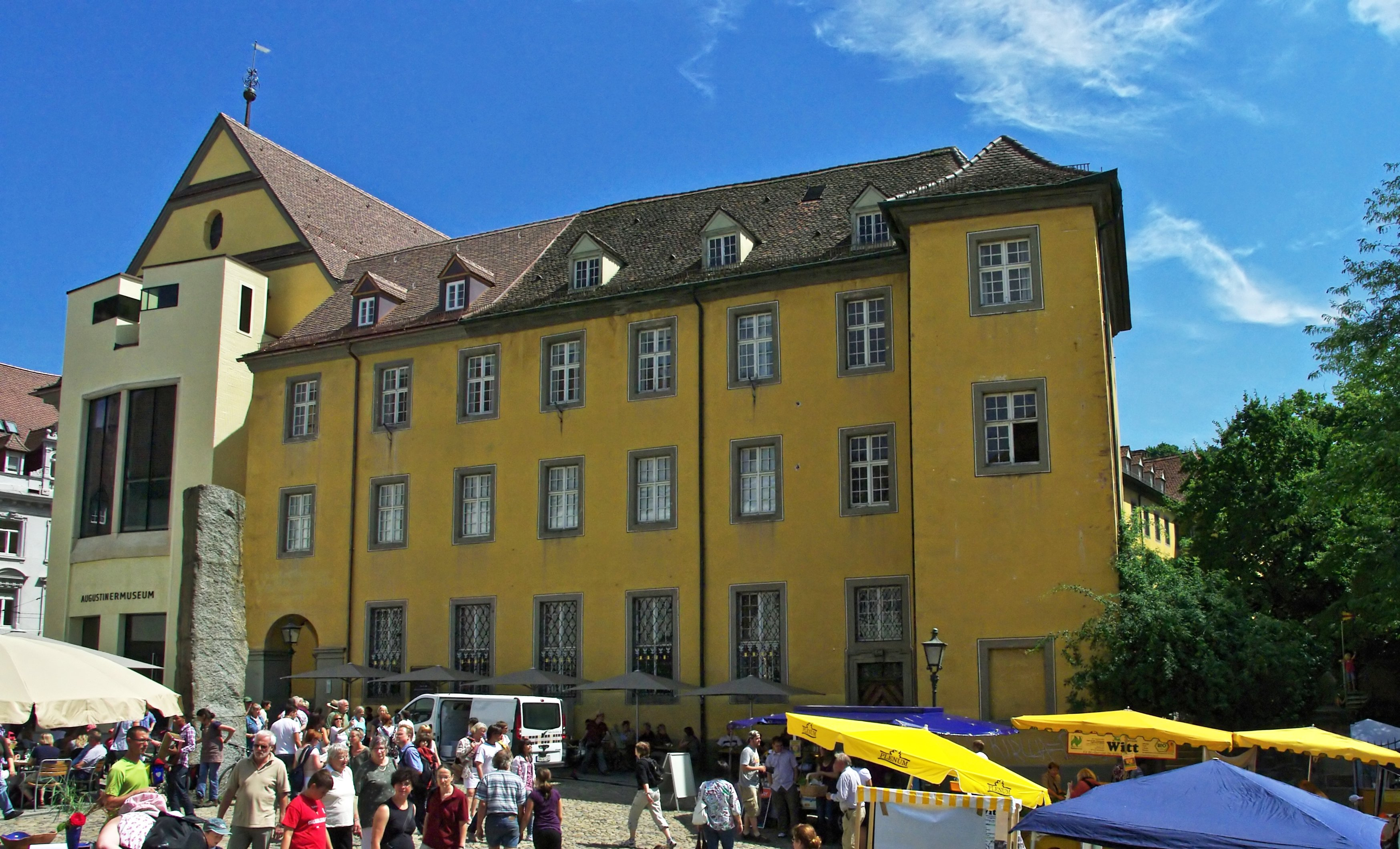
The building complex of the Augustiner Museum.

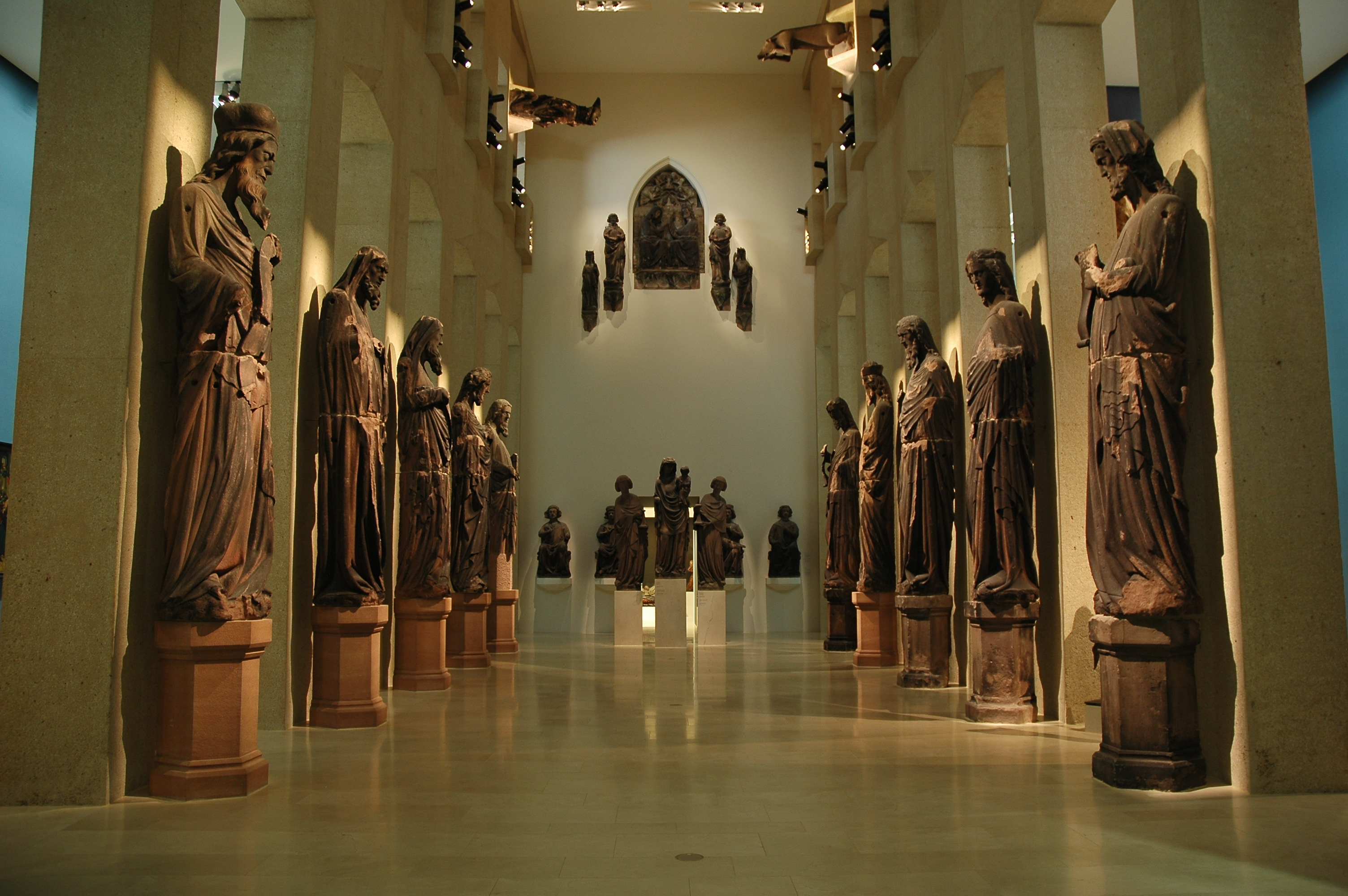
The Sculpture Hall with the prophets from the cathedral.

Augustiner Museum, Freiburg im Breisgau, Baden-Württemberg

The Augustiner Museum is a museum in Freiburg im Breisgau, Germany located in the former Augustinian Monastery building. It is undergoing an extensive renovation and expansion, the first phase of which ended in 2010.

== The museum ==
The museum is located in a former Augustinian monastery which was rebuilt between 1914 and 1923. The First World War not only interrupted the rebuilding but also severely restricted it compared to the original plans, due to lack of funds. The current total renovation, which is planned to include the addition of new exhibitions rooms, began in 2004. The museum's collection, which was begun by the city of Freiburg in the 1880s, can be only partially exhibited due to the building work.

The visual art and sculpture collection includes works by Lucas Cranach the Elder, Anselm Feuerbach, Hans Baldung Grien, Matthias Grünewald, the Master of the Housebook, Hans Thoma, and Franz Xaver Winterhalter. There is also a sculpture hall with four-metre-high stone prophets from Freiburg Cathedral, a church organ from Welte & Sons with an exterior from the 1730s, and a library of art and cultural history. The Museum of Municipal History (Museum für Stadtgeschichte) is a department of the Augustiner Museum.

The collections that are not on display, or only partially, include a large collection of prints and drawings, decorative art, domestic artefacts from the Black Forest region, collections of coins and timepieces, and a 14th-century carpet.

In 2010 the museum did not make it to the final stage of the Awards for Innovative Developments in Tourism by the British Guild of Travel Writers, but came in sixth.

=== Reconstruction ===
Since 2004 a general reconstruction of the building site has been taking place. Christoph Mäckler, an architect from Frankfurt, was instructed with the planning. The duration of the reconstruction was originally planned to be 5 to 8 years. Until 2010, during first construction phase, the church building was reconstructed. First, archeological excavations as well as measures to stabilize the church building took place. The roof truss, which was heavily infested with wood preservatives, fungi and other pests, was disinfected, decontaminated and taken off in 2007. The damaged parts were restored. In the summer of 2009 the roof truss was straightened up again and put onto the rest of the building. During this time, the church building was a large construction site. By installing an elevator, the building is now barrier free. This also facilitates the transport of the exhibits. Circular galleries were installed. Additional exhibition space was created in the basement floor to provide for special shows for all of Freiburg's museums. In the attic there is now room for a painting gallery. A café was opened in the former treasury as well as the cloister, which both are on the main floor.

In June 2010, the exhibition hall was opened. In cooperation with the Museum of Modern Arts in Freiburg, the opening was celebrated with a double exhibition of the works by Katharina Grosse and her mother Barbara.

Many of the exhibits can't be shown for spatial and preserving reasons even after the end of the first stage of redevelopment in March 2010. This is why e.g. the section of everyday culture and folklore can't be exhibited yet and the craftwork section is still very fragmentary. This state of repair will remain until the third stage of redevelopment is completed.

The second stage of construction was due to begin in 2010 with the redevelopment and construction of the functional sectors at Salzstraße, where among other sections the collection of graphic arts which consists of more than 70.000 prints and drawings and an appropriate space for deliveries are now located. The gatehouse, which was constructed incorporating historical elements in 1920, was replaced by a new building. According to the Freiburg city council this phase of construction was initially supposed to cost 8.5 million Euros. However this project, which was supposed to be planned in early 2011, was put under scrutiny, since there were cuts in the culture budget of the city. After the second phase of construction had been approved in mid February the gatehouse was taken down in 2012 and archaeological examinations of the site began. Construction started in the summer of 2013. The new building in Salzstraße was finished by the end of 2015 and cost 15,3 million euros.

During the third phase of construction the cloister building is currently (2019) being renovated as well as 3 old cellars.

== History ==
The Augustiner Museum displays a municipal collection of art which was founded in the 1880s by Lord Mayor Otto Winterer. In 1909, the architect Rudolf Schmidt drafted a conversion of this former cloister into a museum. Until then, the cloister had been used by the Theater Freiburg Theater Freiburg. In 1915, the conversion had to be ceased due to the First World War First World War. Work on the building resumed in 1919 under the direction of architectural historian Karl Gruber. The museum opened its doors in November 1923. Originally, the conversion should have resulted in a central museum site in Freiburg, but due to restricted municipal funds after the war, the conversion had to be carried out in a severely limited and provisional way. The building remained in this provisional state up until 2010. Due to contamination caused by wood preservation agents, some of the museum's wings had been closed for a number of years since they were mostly unusable.

The administrative directors have been:

- Werner Noack
- 1953–1974 Hermann Gombert
- 1974–1992 Hans H. Hofstätter
- 1993–2002 Saskia Durian-Ress
- 2002–2008 Detlef Zinke
- 2008–2022 Tilmann von Stockhausen
- 2022/23 Peter Kalchthaler
- since March 2023 Jutta Götzmann

In 2010, the Association of British Guild of Travel Writers British Guild of Travel Writers awarded the lately refurbished Augustiner Museum as one of the best new tourist attractions worldwide. In their category "best foreign project", the Augustiner Museum was presented as one of only six attractions and was allowed for reviewing.

== Exhibition ==
The western facade of the church building got a new entrance and opens out to the Augustinerplatz with a foyer.

A sculpture hall whose central space remains reserved for original figures and sculptures from the Freiburg Minster is located in the church building reconstructed by Christoph Mäckler. Panel paintings and wood sculptures surround the hall in cabinets on the ground floor as well as the gallery upstairs. Here, works by Matthias Grünewald, Lucas Cranach the Elder, Martin Schaffner and Hans Baldung can be found, along with "Christ on a Donkey" (1350/60), and a number of paintings from the Speyer Altarpiece by the Master of the Housebook (circa 1480). Medieval stained glass from the Freiburg Minster is presented on two levels. The Kaiser windows can also be seen in the dark from the porch entrance outside.

Sculptures, altars, paintings, and statuettes of the Baroque era can be found in the chancel of the former abbey. Large figures overlook the room from within niches of eight-metre high typecases. A narrow, fourteen-metre long display case runs like a ribbon along the side wall. It is home to many statuettes and paintings. The organ case from the abbey church of Gengenbach, which was built in the 1720s, is the showpiece of the museum. The organ itself was attached by the local company M. Welte & Söhne in the year 1935. In the attic one can find paintings from the 19th century by Franz Xaver Winterhalter, Hans Thoma, Anselm Feuerbach and many more. The paintings show the countryside, portraits, genre scenes, allegorical and religious themes. The space which is used to show those pieces of art is around 1.400 square kilometres big, air-conditioned and barrier-free. The basement of the former Augustinian's church?( Augustinerkirche) contains a modern exhibition hall which is almost 450 square kilometres in area. This hall makes it possible for the city of Freiburg to host special exhibitions according to the international conservational standards. The exhibits of the treasure chamber are again available to the public since the 22 January 2011. The chamber contains gold- and silversmithery manufactured from the 9th to 18th century. The items are part of the treasure of the Freiburger Münster. Additionally, there are works from the collections of the archiepiscopal diocesan museum and the Adelhausen foundation.

=== The pipe organ ===
The pipe organ, consisting of the historical casing (built 1732/33) from the former church of Gengenbach Abbey and a church organ from M. Welte & Sons (built in 1935) is listed under monumental protection as a total work of art and had to be dismantled in the course of the static reconstruction. In the course of 2009, the casing as well as the organ were completely refurbished. After the removal of the brown paintwork from the 19. century, the casing was modeled back to its original state as well as possible. After a Europe-wide, open competitive bidding, the company Waldkircher Orgelbau Jäger & Brommer was chosen to remove later additions to the organ and restore its original tonal condition from 1944. The organ is open for visitors in the scope of groups up to 18 people.

=== Other exhibits ===
- 'Grablegung der heiligen Ursula', painting around 1440/50
- 'Der Maltererteppich as part of a collection of late medieval textiles (new exhibition 2012)
- Works by Dionys Ganter (1798–1862)

== Library ==
The library of the Augustinermuseum is a public reference library, situated in the administration building in the Gerberau 16. It emphasizes on contemporary art, art history, folklore and craftwork. The holdings are mostly available via the Südwestdeutscher Bibliotheksverbund.

== Literature ==
=== Inventory catalogues ===
- Detlef Zinke: Meisterwerke vom Mittelalter bis zum Barock im Augustinermuseum. Deutscher Kunstverlag, Berlin 2010, ISBN 978-3-422-06948-0.
- Detlef Zinke: Augustinermuseum: Gemälde bis 1800. Rombach, Freiburg 1990, ISBN 3-7930-0582-8.
- Detlef Zinke: Bildwerke des Mittelalters und der Renaissance 1100–1530. Auswahlkatalog / Augustinermuseum Freiburg. München 1995, ISBN 3-7774-6560-7.
- Uhren aus vier Jahrhunderten: Sammlung Ehrensberger / Augustinermuseum Freiburg i. Br. Katalogbearb. Gerhard Wagner und Ian Fowler. Augustinermuseum, Freiburg i. Br. 1999.
- Margret Zimmermann: Gemälde 19. und 20. Jahrhundert: Augustinermuseum Freiburg; Bestandskatalog. Freiburg i. Br. 2004, ISBN 3-937014-01-2.
- Mit Stift und Feder. Zeichnungen vom Klassizismus bis zum Jugendstil. Petersberg, Imhof, 2013. ISBN 978-3-86568-879-8.

=== Exhibition catalogue (selection) ===
- Zu Dürers Zeiten: Druckgraphik des 15. und 16. Jahrhunderts aus dem Augustinermuseum Freiburg. Freiburg i. Br. 1991
- Hans Baldung Grien in Freiburg. Katalog der Ausstellung im Augustinermuseum, 19. Oktober 2000 bis 15. Januar 2002. Freiburg i. Br. 2001, ISBN 3-7930-9303-4.
- Jugendstil in Freiburg. Begleitbuch zur Ausstellung, 2. März bis 13. Mai 2001 im Augustinermuseum Freiburg. Freiburg i. Br. 2001, ISBN 3-7930-9287-9.
- Detlef Zinke: Verborgene Pracht: mittelalterliche Buchkunst aus acht Jahrhunderten in Freiburger Sammlungen. Katalog der Ausstellung des Augustinermuseums Freiburg in der Universitätsbibliothek Freiburg, 8. Juni bis 28. Juli 2002. Lindenberg 2002, ISBN 3-89870-059-3.
- Eichen, wiegen, messen um den Freiburger Münstermarkt. Augustinermuseum Freiburg, Ausstellung vom 31. Januar bis 27. April 2003. Freiburg i. Br. 2003.
- Aus Freiburg in die Welt – 100 Jahre Welte-Mignon: automatische Musikinstrumente. Augustinermuseum, Ausstellung vom 17. September 2005 bis 8. Januar 2006. Freiburg i. Br. 2005.
- Eine Stadt braucht Klöster. Katalog der Ausstellung vom 25. Mai bis 1. Oktober 2006 im Augustinermuseum Freiburg i. Br. Lindenberg 2006, ISBN 3-89870-275-8.
- Unser Schwarzwald. Romantik und Wirklichkeit. Katalog der Ausstellung 2011. Imhof, Petersberg 2011, ISBN 978-3-86568-641-1.

=== General (selection) ===
- Augustinermuseum, Freiburg im Breisgau. Hg. von den Städtischen Museen Freiburg, Augustinermuseum und dem Kuratorium Augustinermuseum Freiburg e.V. Freiburg i.Br./Berlin/Wien 2011, ISBN 978-3-7930-5075-9.
- 70 Jahre Augustinermuseum Freiburg: vom Kloster zum Museum. Ausstellung vom 2. Dezember 1993 bis 27. März 1994. München 1993, ISBN 3-7774-6350-7.
- Frank Löbbecke: Hausbau und Klosterkirche: bauarchäologische Untersuchungen im Freiburger Augustinermuseum. In: Archäologische Ausgrabungen in Baden-Württemberg. Band 2002, S. 191–195.
- Jahresbericht des Augustinermuseums. Freiburg 1995 ff.

Jahresbericht 1993–1994.
Jahresbericht 1995–1996.
Jahresbericht 1997–1999.
Jahresbericht 2000–2001.
Jahresbericht 2002–2004.
Jahresbericht 2005–2007.

- Chris van Uffelen: Museumsarchitektur. Ullman, Potsdam 2010, ISBN 978-3-8331-6058-5. Seiten 248–251.

== Bibliography ==
- Van Uffelen, Chris. Contemporary Museums – Architecture, History, Collections, Braun Publishing, 2010, ISBN 978-3-03768-067-4, pages 248–251.
