= Johann Baptist Kirner =

German painter

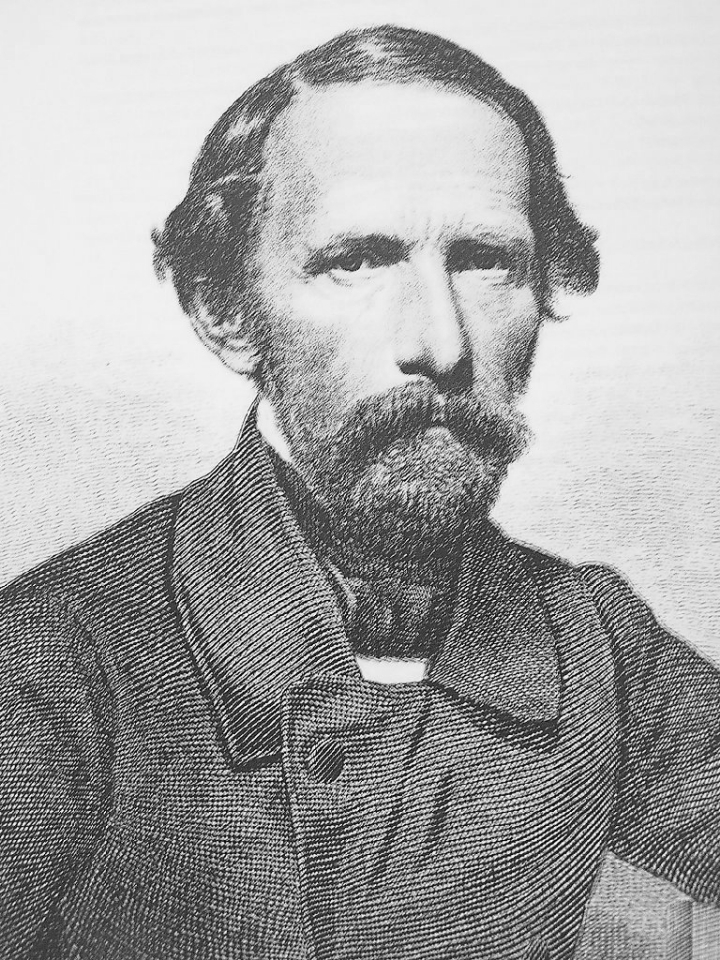
Johann Baptist Kirner (date unknown)

Johann Baptist Kirner (25 June 1806 in Furtwangen – 19 November 1866 in Furtwangen) was a German portrait and genre painter.

== Life and work ==
He was one of seven children born to the shoemaker, Johann Kirner (1772-1835). For financial reasons, he initially had to learn art through apprenticeships with a coach painter in Freiburg and a decorative painter in Villingen. His older brother, the portrait painter Lukas Kirner, who had served similar apprenticeships, was admitted to the Augsburg art school (today Augsburg University of Applied Sciences) in 1822, at age of twenty-eight.

In 1824, Johann was finally able to attend the Academy of Fine Arts, Munich. Three years later, he received funds from a scholarship established by Marie Ellenrieder; awarded to him by Leopold, Grand Duke of Baden. At first, he focused on works with religious themes, but soon turned to secular subjects; creating some humorous pictures based on the poems of Johann Peter Hebel. After 1829, he was a free-lance artist in Munich.

He was awarded another scholarship from the Grand Duke in 1832, which enabled him to study in Italy. He lived in Rome from 1832 to 1834, sharing a studio with his friend, Franz Xaver Winterhalter, who was also from the Black Forest region. He also spent some time in Naples. In 1837, he left Italy and established himself in Vienna.

By 1839 he was back in Furtwangen, and was appointed a Court painter for the Grand Duchy of Baden in Karlsruhe. He moved there in 1842, and given an annual pension of 400 Gulden, on the condition that he provide at least one painting for the Grand Ducal gallery every two years. He was apparently unhappy there, as he went back to Munich in 1844, periodically requesting leave from his duties. In 1856, he became an honorary member of the Munich Academy. In 1865, he retired to his hometown, where he died the following year.

His gravestone was designed by one of his relatives; the sculptor Adolf Heer. A street in Freiburg's Waldsee district has been named after him.

== Selected paintings ==
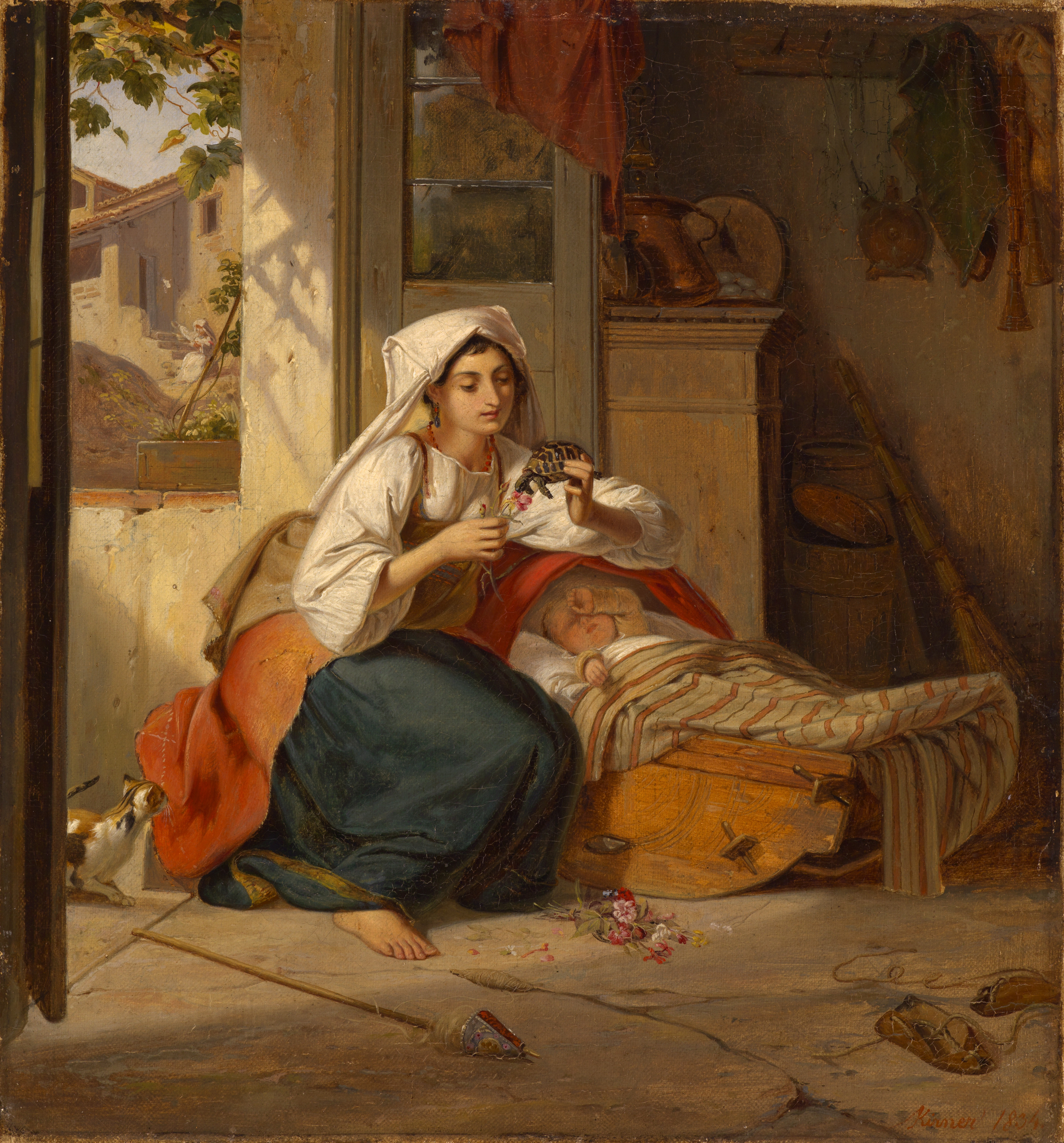
Italian Woman at the Cradle

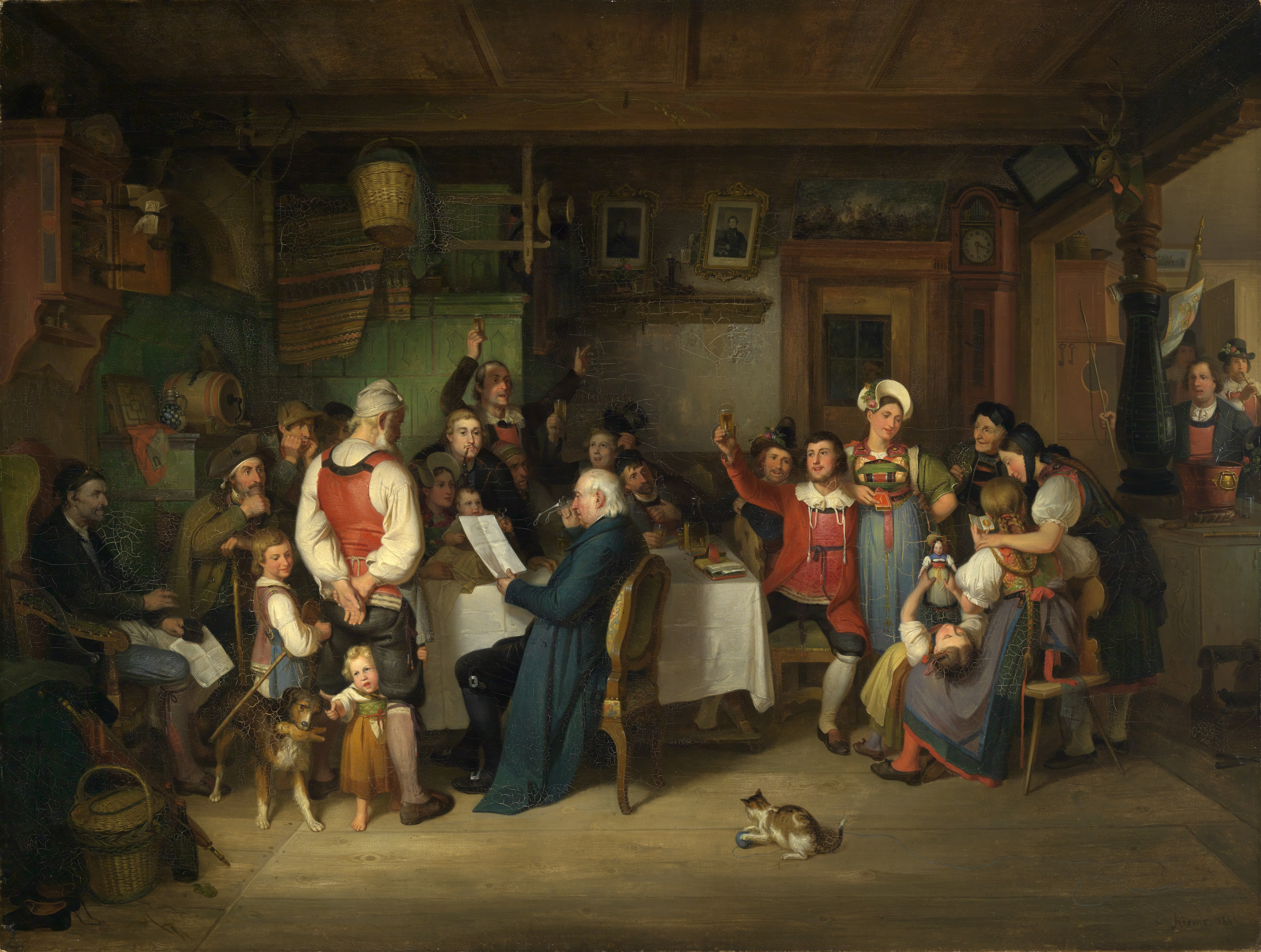
The Award Ceremony of an
Agricultural Association

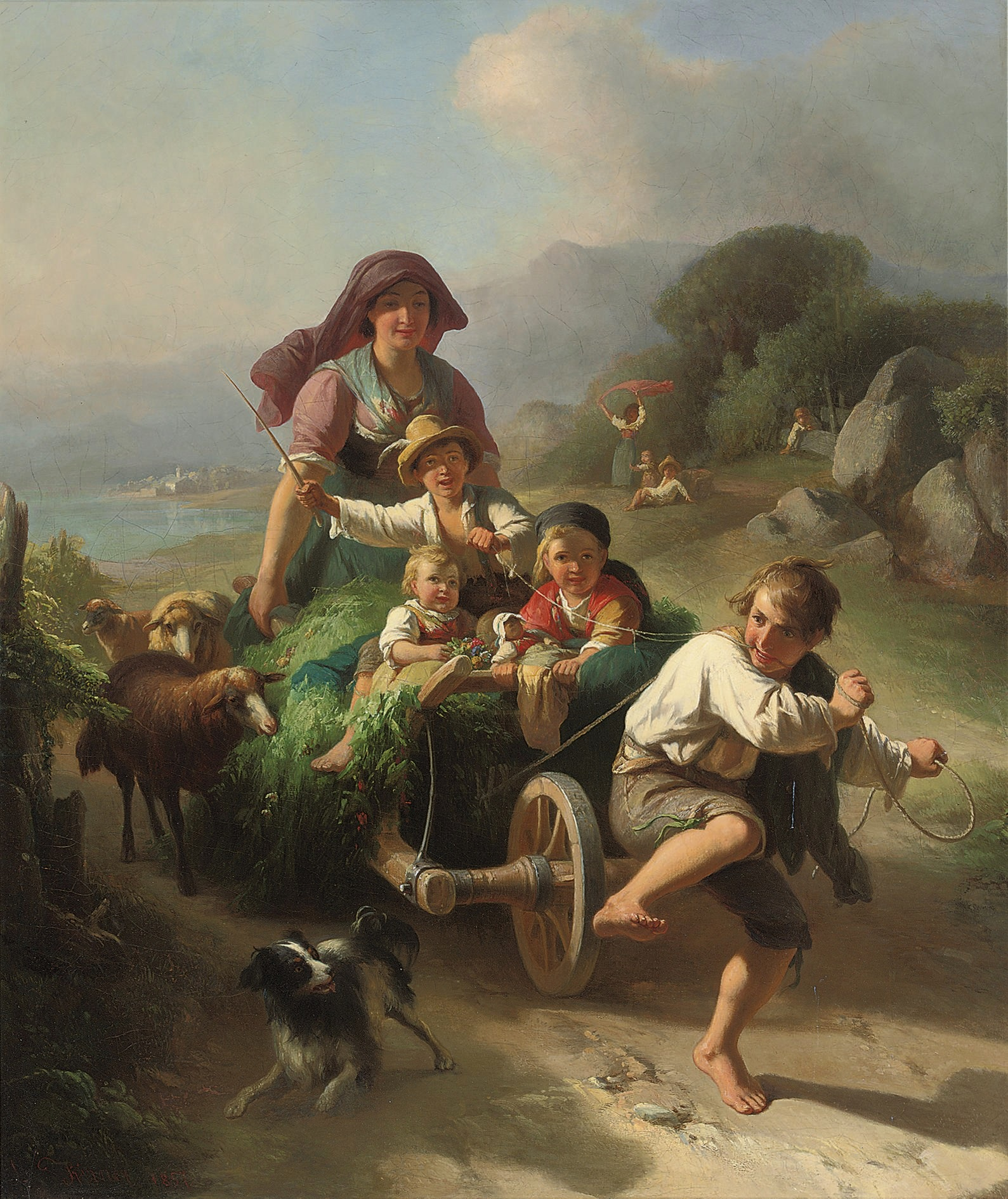
Young Harvest Workers

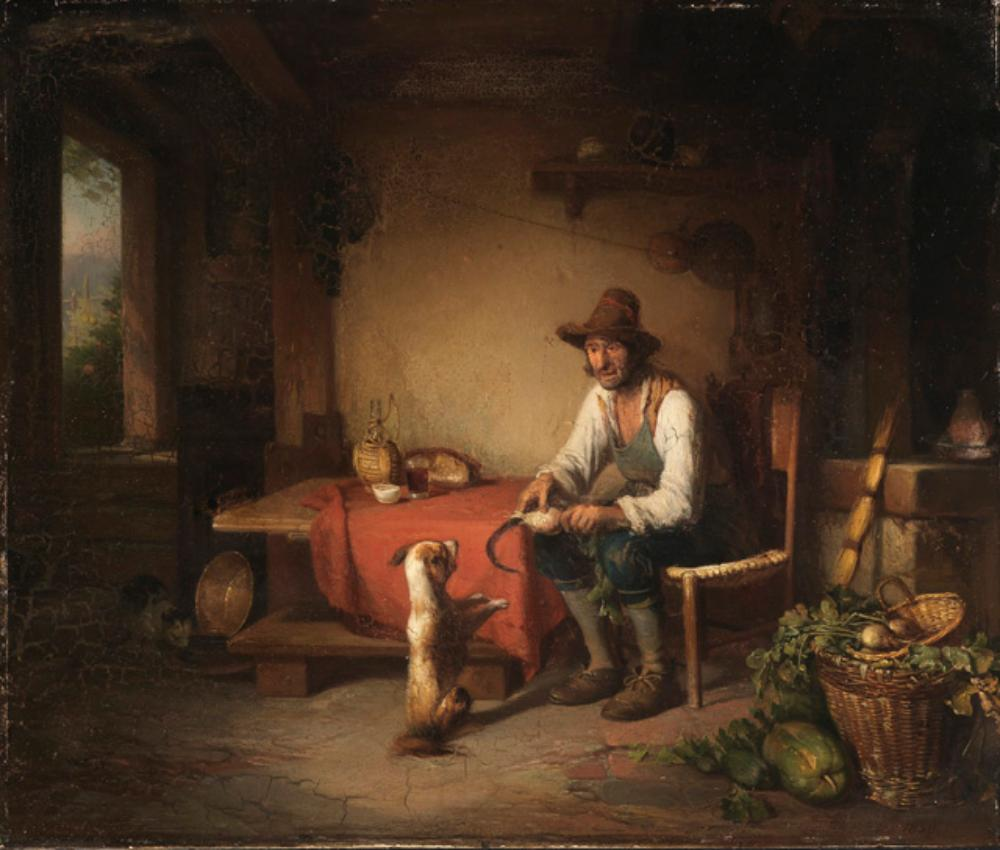
Italian Farmer Playing with His Dog

== Sources ==
- Johann August Ritter von Eisenhart (1882). "Kirner, Johann Baptist". Allgemeine Deutsche Biographie (in German). Vol. 16. Leipzig: Duncker & Humblot. pp. 26–30.
- Christian Baumann: "Johann Baptist Kirner, ein bedeutender Maler des Schwarzwaldes 1806–1866", in: Badische Heimat, Vol.1/1956
- Gabriele Brugger: Lebensweisen – Genremalerei von J. B. Kirner und J. B. Pflug. Exhibition catalog, Kunstmuseum Hohenkarpfen, Beuroner Kunstverlag, Beuron, 2004, ISBN 3-930569-27-2
- Geschichts- und Heimatverein Furtwangen e. V., Johann Baptist Kirner 1806–1866. Ausstellung zum 150. Todestag, Exhibition catalogue, Furtwangen, 2016, ISBN 978-3-00-054879-6
- Johann Baptist Kirner. Erzähltes Leben. Ed.: Adila Garbanzo León, Felix Reuße, Tilmann von Stockhausen. Exhibition catalogue. Augustinermuseum Freiburg. Imhof-Verlag 2021. ISBN 978-3-7319-1075-6
