= Waldsee =

Waldsee may refer to:

- Waldsee, Palatinate, a municipality in Rhineland-Palatinate, Germany
- Waldsee (Freiburg im Breisgau), a district of Freiburg im Breisgau, Baden-Württemberg, Germany
- Bad Waldsee, a town in Baden-Württemberg, Germany
- Waldsee (camp), a German language summer camp in Minnesota, US

== See also ==
- Lords of Walsee
