= Lorettoberg =

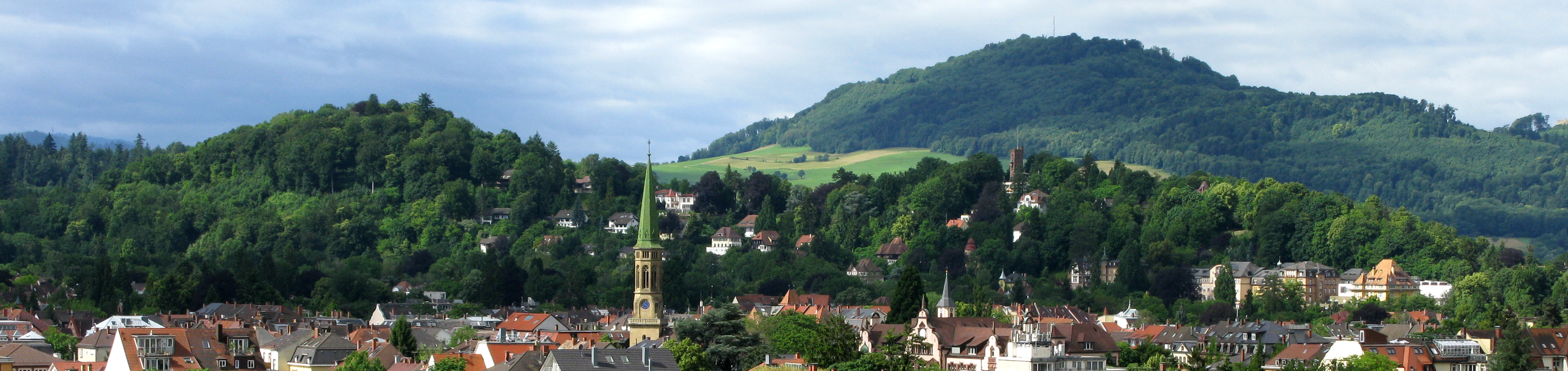
- Lorettoberg with Schönberg in the background

Highest point
- Elevation: 384.5 m above sea level (NHN) (1,261 ft)
- Coordinates: 47°58′46″N 7°50′17″E

Geography
- Location within Baden-Württemberg
- Location: Baden-Württemberg
- Parent range: Black Forest

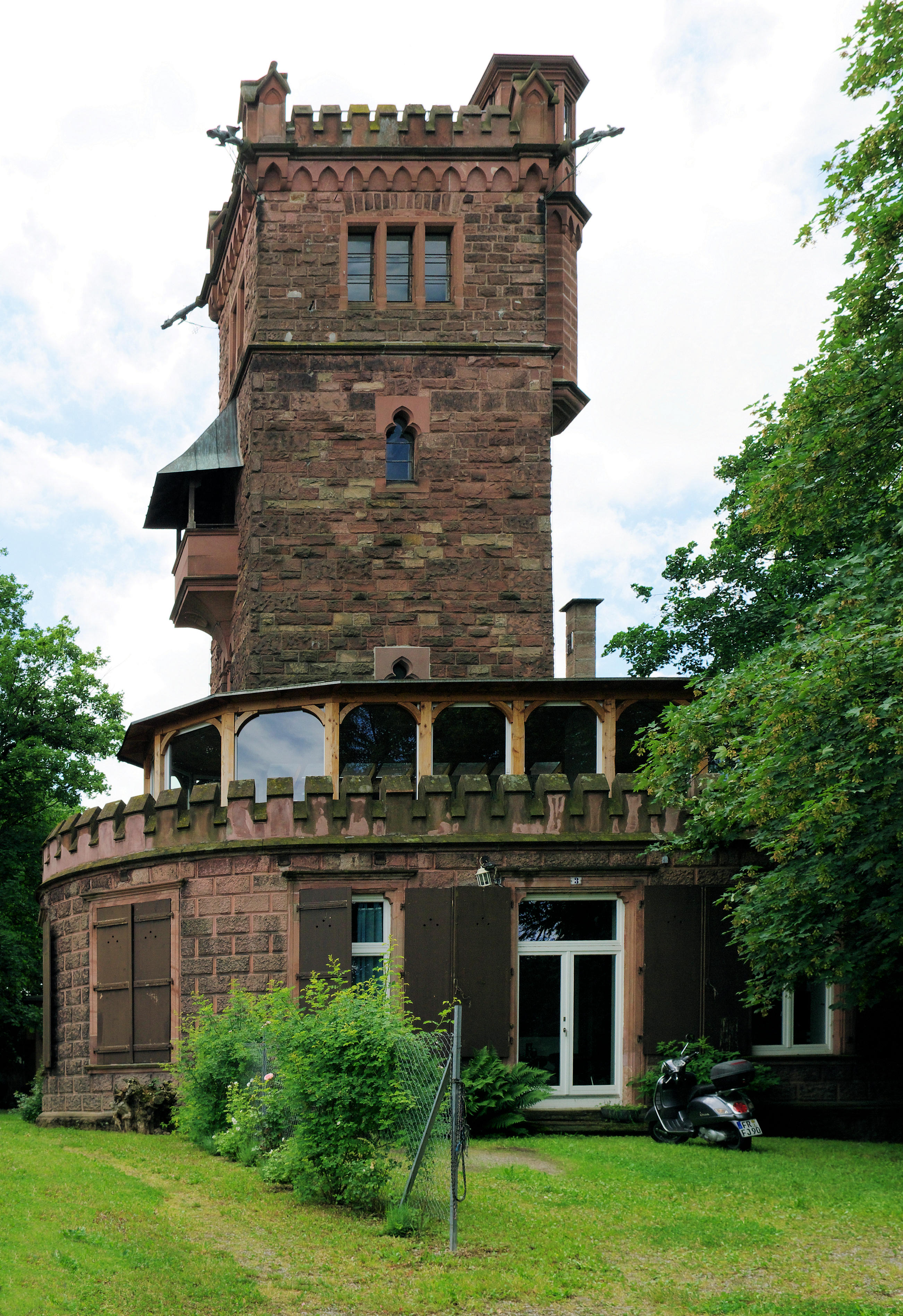
Hildaturm

The Lorettoberg, also known as Josephsbergle in Freiburg, is a mountain ridge in the South-West of the Wiehre district in the city of Freiburg im Breisgau in Germany. The mountain, with its elevation of 384.5 meters (1,261 ft) above sea level, is wooded at its peak. It divides the district Unterwiehre-Süd and borders the Vauban district in the West. 500 meters (1,600 ft) north of the "peak" there is a high spur 348 m (1,142 ft) above sea level, next to which the eponymous Lorettokapelle is located. The name derives from Loreto, the second biggest Italian (Mary-) pilgrimage destination, after the St. Peter's Basilica in Rome. The Schloss-Café is located at the top of the mountain making the Lorettoberg a popular destination for a getaway, strolling and a local recreation area.

The eastern main edge fault of the Upper Rhine Rift drags through Lorettoberg and the Höllentalbahn runs through the mountain via the Lorettotunnel. When the tunnel was built, a "geological window" was left open, through which the fault can be seen and where further decline of the Upper Rhine Rift can be measured.

== Buildings ==
The 22.6-meter-high (74 ft) Hildaturm (English: Hilda tower) has been standing on the subpeak at the north side of the main summit since 1886. It is built in Medieval Bergfried style and is a memorial of the day Princess Hilda Charlotte Wilhelmine of Nassau the last Grand Duchy of Baden moved to Freiburg following her marriage to Fredrick II, Grand Duke of Baden. The Hildaturm was used as an observation tower for aerial surveillance during the World War II. During summer, the 19.86-meter-high (65.2 ft) observation deck is open to the public on selected weekdays.

A little north of the Hildaturm, the Lorettokapelle, which consists of three single chapels and was founded by citizens of Freiburg in 1657, can be found. The church is a memorial to the bloody war that took place around Lorettoberg in 1644 (Battle of Freiburg) described among others by Reinhold Schneider a poet who used to live at Lorettoberg. Next to the Lorettokapelle, there is the "Schloss-Café" in the Guesthouse of the Lorettoberg, which was built in 1902 in the Art Nouveau style. Before this, a 19th-century building called "brother house" was located at the same spot. However, this building eventually became too small to host the numerous visitors and thus had to give way to the present construction.

It was at this very spot that French king Louis XV watched the shelling of Freiburg by his troops in 1744 during War of the Austrian Succession. A Cannonball that nearly hit him is immured in one of Lorretokapelle walls. Not far to the northwest of this point at the west side, one can still see the former quarry from which the stones used to construct the Freiburg Münster were excavated. Other quarries and clay pits can be found at Lorettoberg. Some were already used in the Middle Ages. One remaining clay pit, for example, is the lower Schlierbergweiher. During a detonation in 1896, the hydrophilic layer of the clay pit was damaged and the pit ran full of water, which is why the use of it was abandoned.

There are a few scattered houses built in Historistic style in the eastside of Lorettoberg, which were largely built between 1870 and 1914. The westside, which is sometimes referred to as "Schlierberg", has low building density that predominantly originates from the second half of the 20th century. Moreover, hillside vineyards belonging to the Staatlichen Weinbauinstitut Freiburg (Freiburg's public institute for viticulture) can be found there. Since recently, the headquarters of the Badischer Landwirtschaftlicher Hautpverband (Baden agricultural association) are in an unusual, multistory, wooden passive house, also called the Haus der Bauern (House of the farmers). The building is located at the Merzhauser street which runs along the foot of the mountain.

Several of the numerous villas at the Lorettoberg belong to student fraternities. The Catholic Loretto hospital is on the east side, and on the foot of the mountain there is the Loretto Baths, an open-air swimming pool with a women and children only area. The Loretto Baths which are perhaps one of the last of its kind in whole Germany. From there (at the corner Loretto-/Mercystrasse) the so-called Bergleweg, a footpath, leads up to the chapel. The Way of St.James and the Zaehringer-trail run on this path. Before the ascent, there is the Chalet Widmer on the right, a Swiss-style prefabricated house of 1887 which was shown in the same year in the Upper Rhine crafts' exhibition and meanwhile is under conservation of historic buildings. Further South there is the Silvicultural Research Institute of Baden-Wuerttemberg and the "Foresthouse", a non-profit organization sponsored education and information center on the subjects of forest and sustainability.

On the southwestern foothill, the Heliotrope designed by the architect Rolf Disch, who also designed the nearby solar-powered village in Freiburg's district Vauban, can be found.

== Miscellaneous ==
In the crime story Lorettoberg by Volkmar Braunbehrens two people are murdered in the neighborhood of the villas on the eastern slope of the Lorettoberg.
