= Eduard Mantius =

German tenor

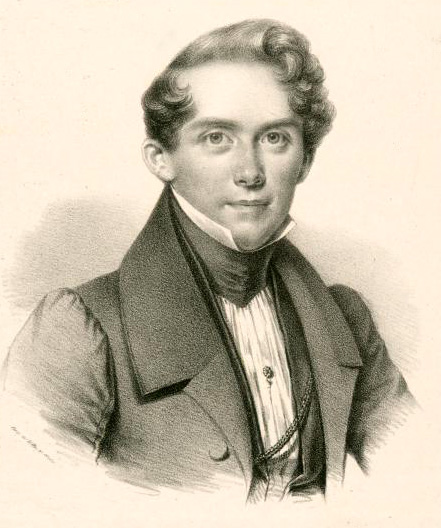
Eduard Mantius um 1840

Jacob Eduard Mantius (18 January 1806 – 4 July 1874) was a German operatic tenor, composer, and voice teacher.

== Life ==
Born in Schwerin, Mantius, at the request of his father, a factory owner, began studying law at the University of Rostock in the autumn of 1826. A year later, he discontinued his studies and moved to Leipzig to study music, taking singing lessons with Christian August Pohlenz, the director of the Gewandhausorchester at the time. In 1829, he sang the tenor parts at a concert in Halle (Saale) conducted by Gasparo Spontini, the general music director of the Staatsoper Unter den Linden in Berlin. In the same year, he became a member of the Berliner Singakademie, which was conducted by Karl Friedrich Zelter. In 1830, King Frederick William III of Prussia appointed him as a singer at his court opera. He debuted there with great success as Tamino in Mozart's Magic Flute. His sonorous tenor and acting talent soon brought him fame beyond Berlin. After ending his stage career in 1857, during which he performed 152 roles, he gave singing lessons and found success as a composer of songs.

== Students ==
- Hermann Thomaschek, Eleonore de Ahna, Paul Bulß, Theodor Reichmann, Amanda Tscherpa, Antonie Mielke
