= Kirner =

Kirner is a surname of German origin. Notable people with the surname include:

- Gary Kirner (born 1942), American football player
- Joan Kirner (1938–2015), Australian politician
- Johann Baptist Kirner (1806–1866), German painter
- Randy Kirner (born 1946), American politician
