= Loretto Baths =

Open-air swimming pool in Freiburg im Breisgau, Germany

Coordinates: 47.9836°N 7.8417°E

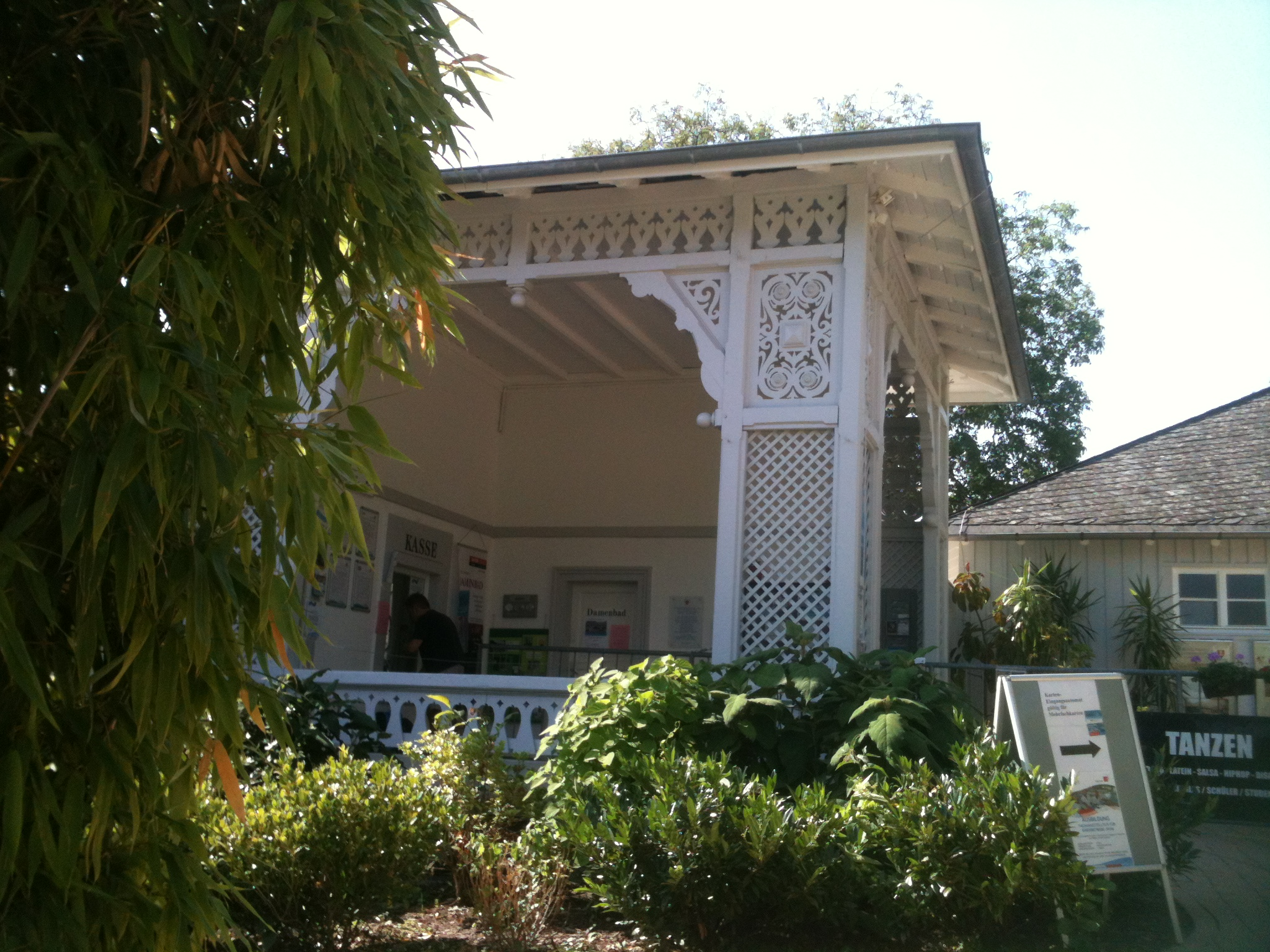
Entrance to the Lorettobad

The Loretto Baths, in short Lollo, is the oldest open-air swimming pool in Germany. It is located at the foot of the Lorettoberg in Wiehre in the city of Freiburg im Breisgau. When it opened in 1841, it was the city's first public swimming bath. Its uniqueness lies in the partial separation of sexes. There is one pool which can be used by women only, but also one for the whole family. To this day, it is the only pool in Germany that has a separate pool for women.

== History ==
The Loretto Baths were founded in 1841 as a cold river bathing facility by Johann Nepomuk Stadler. Thirty years later, he passed the baths on to his son-in-law, Oskar Heim. At first the baths were for gentlemen only. The water for the pool came directly from the Hölderle, a stream which still runs through the grounds of the baths to this date. At the time, the cold water from the stream was heated in a separate pool.

When some pools started to establish areas where women might take a dip in the late 19th century, the Loretto Baths added an area for women too. This women only area is surrounded on all sides by either walls, hedges or changing rooms. In 1886, most women could not swim, but since pools had become fashionable, they were keen to learn.

After Heim´s death, the city of Freiburg purchased the baths and used the pools as a cold store during the winter. During World War I the Reichswehr took charge of the pool and it was no longer open to the public. In 1920, the Loretto Baths were leased to the local swimming club. Conflicts later arose with the community of Günterstal as their waste water was piped into the Hölderle. This problem was later solved by drilling a deep well for the sole use of the Loretto Baths.

In 1926, the city of Freiburg once again took over the running of the bathing facility. Then in 1940, after much heated discussion involving petitions from local citizens´ groups, the women-only area was re-opened to the whole family.

During the Nazi era the Fähnlein scouts of the Preußen - a Hitler youth group - used the pool as a base. In 1945, then again from 1948 to 1951, the swimming pool was confiscated by the military government and closed to the German public. From 1952 onwards it was open to the people of Freiburg once more.

In the 1960s plans were made to construct a ten-story high building for the nearby hospital, but these plans were never realized.

In 1999 the ladies' pool was completely renovated, since which time there has been a significant increase in the number of guests.

A further original feature of the baths are the 125 year-old individual cubicles, which can be rented each season for up to four months.

=== Segregation of the Sexes ===
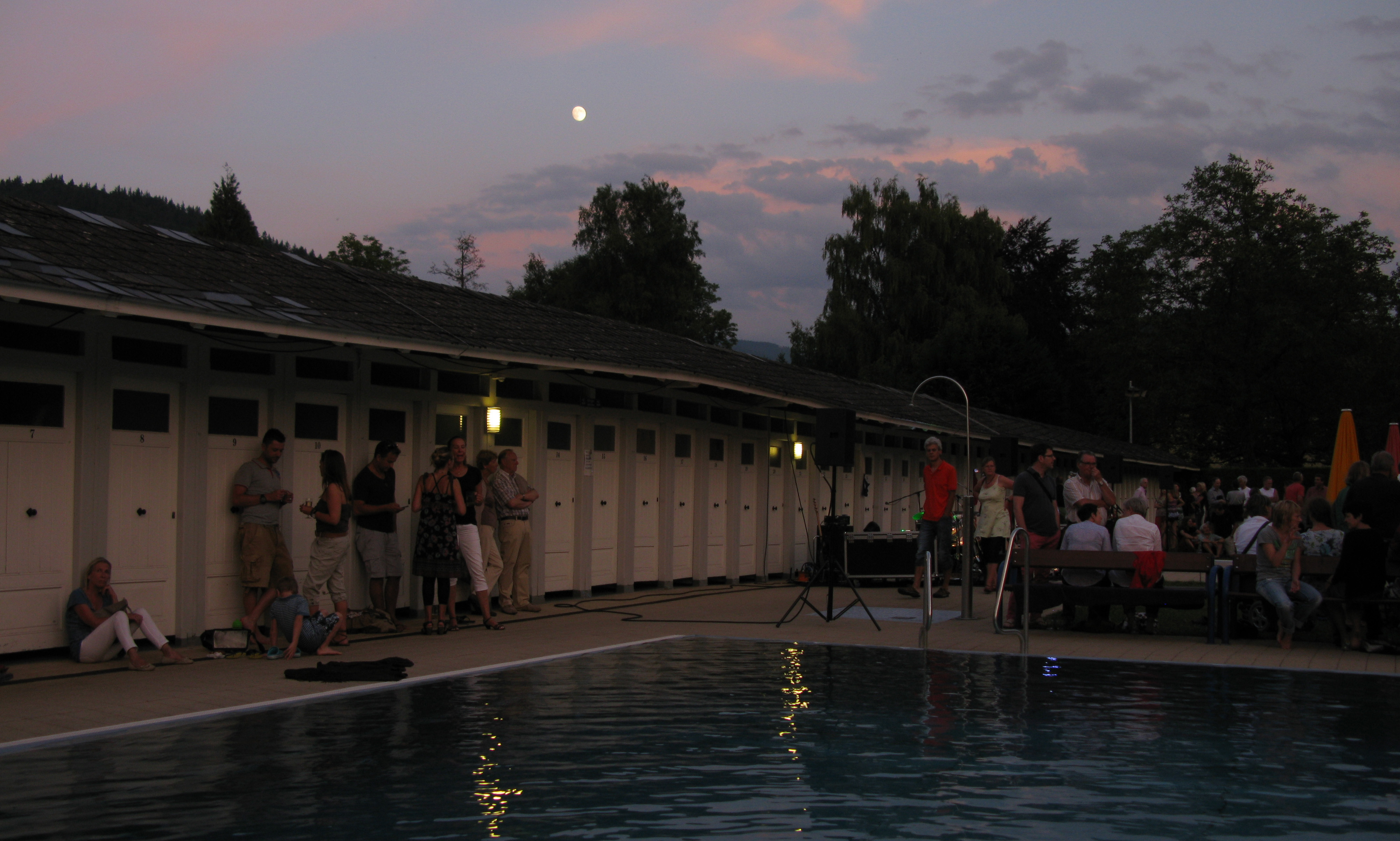
The ladies' pool of the Loretto Baths during a concert. (Note the individual cubicles)

Segregation of the sexes has been abolished everywhere in Freiburg except in the Loretto Baths. In 1980, a law student filed a lawsuit against the city but was unsuccessful, since there was already a family pool right next to the Loretto Baths. The court concluded: "According to §10 of the local code, which says that public institutions have to be used in accordance with their purpose, the interdiction for males to use the ladies' pool of the Loretto Baths does not violate the equality act of the Basic Law for the Federal Republic of Germany"

In addition, women have had the right to bathe topless in the Loretto Baths since the 1970s.

The only man allowed in the ladies' area is the lifeguard, although men are afforded entrance for rare concerts, at which times the normally off-limits area is open to everyone. On such occasions, the Friends of the Lorettobad entertain visitors with choral singing, piano-playing, or orchestral performances. Warning signs are hung out at the entrance to the ladies' area when such events take place: "Men present"! Serious feminists and Muslim women flee as soon as the musicians arrive to set up and practice before a show, others continue bathing.

== Opening Times ==
As the baths are no longer heated, they are only open during the summer, from May to September.

== Facilities ==
=== The Family Baths ===
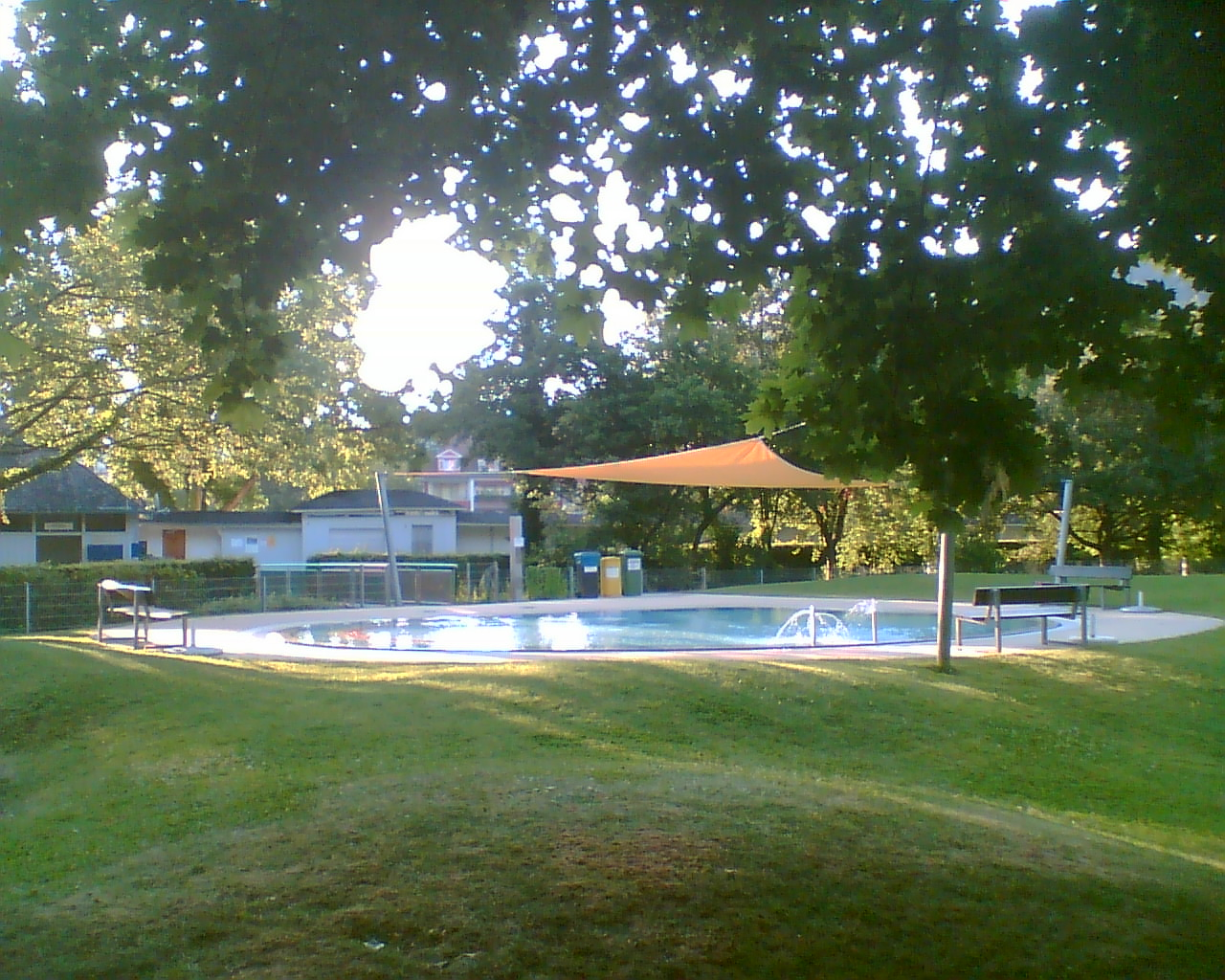
Loretto Baths baby pool

Facilities available:

- a 25 metre pool with an area for non-swimmers
- a children's play pool with a fountain and awning
- a large surrounding meadow for relaxing and playing games
- a children's water slide
- play areas with sand and mud
- sunloungers
- a snack bar
- table-tennis tables
- giant chess game

=== The Women's Baths ===
Facilities available:

- a 25 metre pool with an area for non-swimmers
- a children's play pool with a fountain
- a meadow where you can lie down and relax
- sunloungers
