= Czerniki, Pomeranian Voivodeship =

Czerniki
- Village
- Location within Poland
- Coordinates: 54°0′28″N 18°14′3″E
- Country: Poland
- Voivodeship: Pomeranian
- County: Kościerzyna
- Gmina: Stara Kiszewa

Czerniki [t͡ʂɛrˈniki] is a village in the administrative district of Gmina Stara Kiszewa, within Kościerzyna County, Pomeranian Voivodeship, in northern Poland.

German operatic bass Hermann Thomaschek (1824–1910) was born in the village

For details of the history of the region, see History of Pomerania.
