= Augustinian Monastery, Freiburg =

German monastery

Coordinates: 47°59′38″N 7°51′09″E

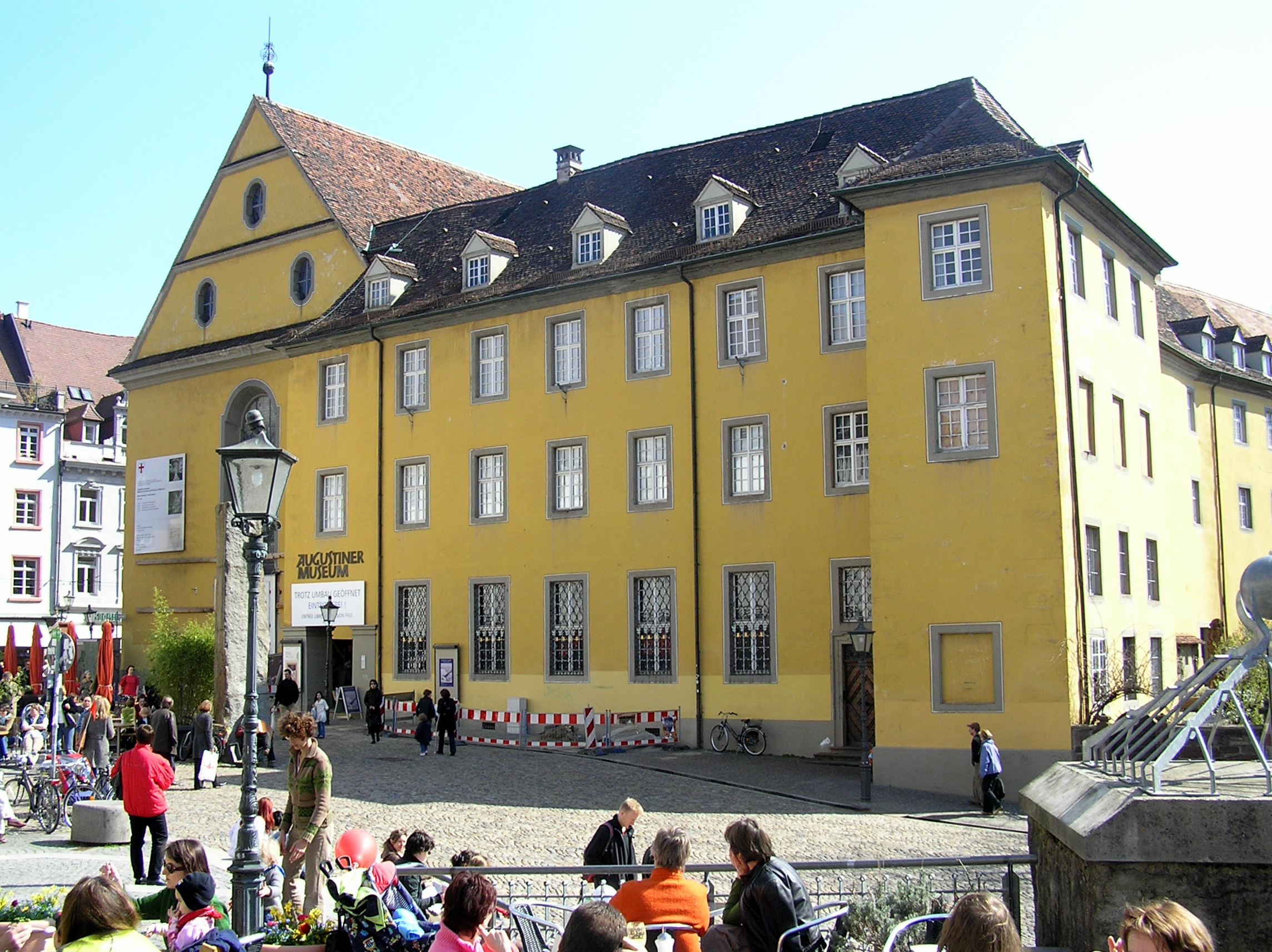
Augustiner Museum Freiburg before 2006

The Augustinian Monastery of Freiburg is a former Augustinian monastery located in the Salzstraße, in the historic center of Freiburg im Breisgau.

From 1278 to 1783, Augustinian monks lived in the buildings. It has a preserved Gothic cloister, and has housed the local art museum "Augustinermuseum" since 1923.

== History ==
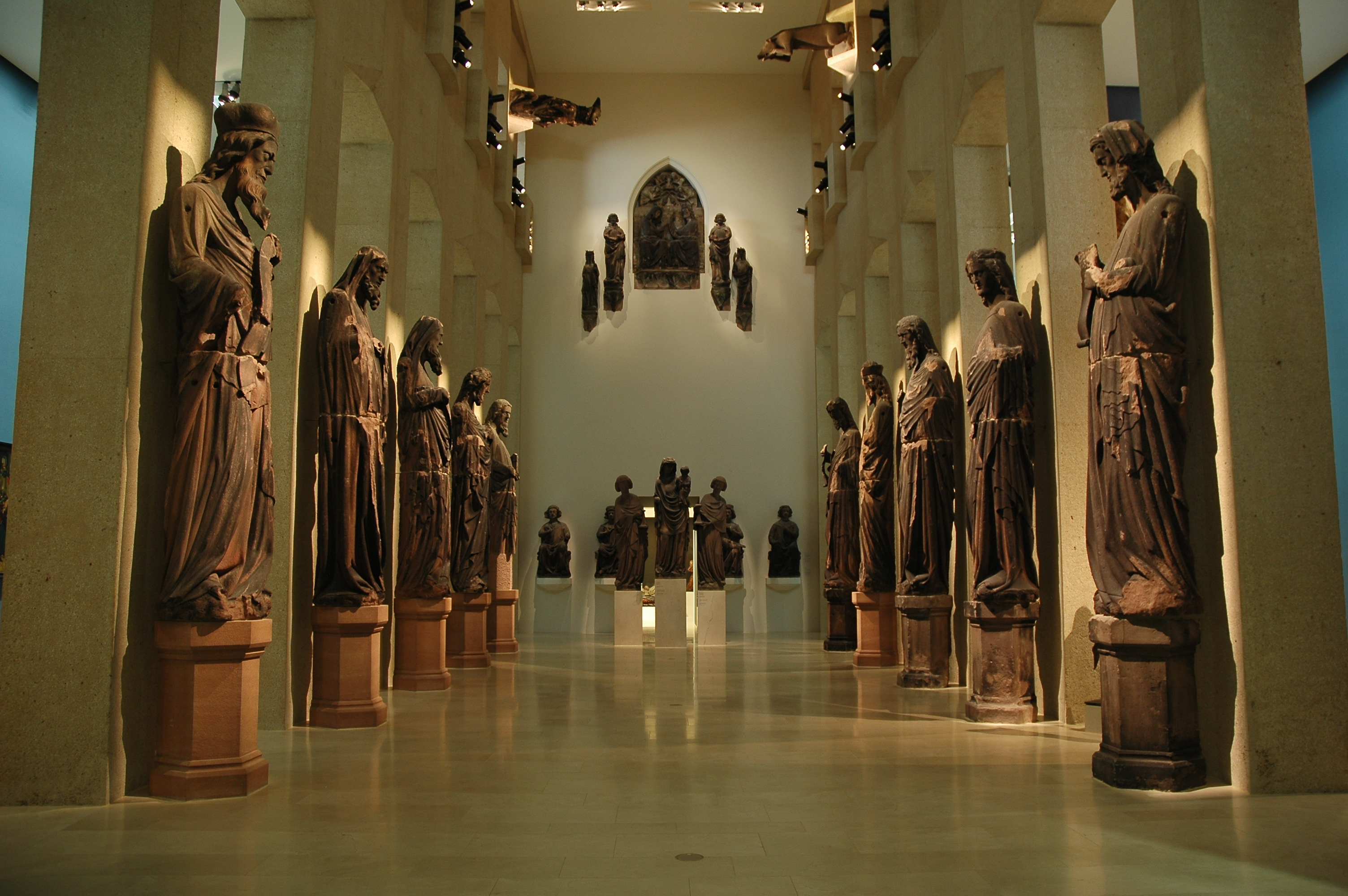
The Sculpture Hall with the prophets from the cathedral

When first built, the Augustinian monastery belonged to the German Ecclesiastical province. After the division of the province in 1299 it became part of a new province, The Rhenic Swabian Province, which included part of Switzerland, Swabia, Alsace, and the Rhineland up to the city of Mainz. In 1781 it changed hands again, when the Austrian government ordered four monasteries in Further Austria to form their own province (Further Austrian Province). The government forbade contact with the Superior General of the Augustinians when the former Prior of Konstanz was appointed as the Director (1782).He was appointed later on appointed as the Provincial Superior (1789). Since the city of Freiburg considered the monasteries of the mendicant orders as their own, because the members of the monastic orders originated from Freiburg, the monasteries were dependent on the city as well.

As specified in the German mediatization the monastery was closed in 1803 and the buildings were put to other use: The nave of the former Augustinian church was used as one of Germany´s first local theaters, which was housed there from 1823 to 1910. When the local theater opened the doors of its own building in 1910, the use of the nave no longer necessary. From 1874 on, the city stored its antiquities in the monastery, but most of the other buildings on the grounds were either neglected or were used as a school building or as an ammunition dump for the troops of Baden.

When Max Wingenroth was designated the new director of the museum, it was decided to house the museum in the former monastery. In the beginning it was only called the municipal museum of Freiburg, but later on, with the addition of the city´s art collection, it became known as the Augustiner Museum. This way, one of the oldest and finest buildings of the city was preserved. Since the building complex is one of the last from the Middle Ages there is still a large amount of historical structure and every now and then pieces dating from the Gothic era are found. Discoveries in the basement of the museum suggest that there were earlier settlements in the area. On the original site seven buildings were destroyed to build the monastery at the beginning of the 14th century and only one building was retained, it is likely that there was a monastery there before today´s was built.

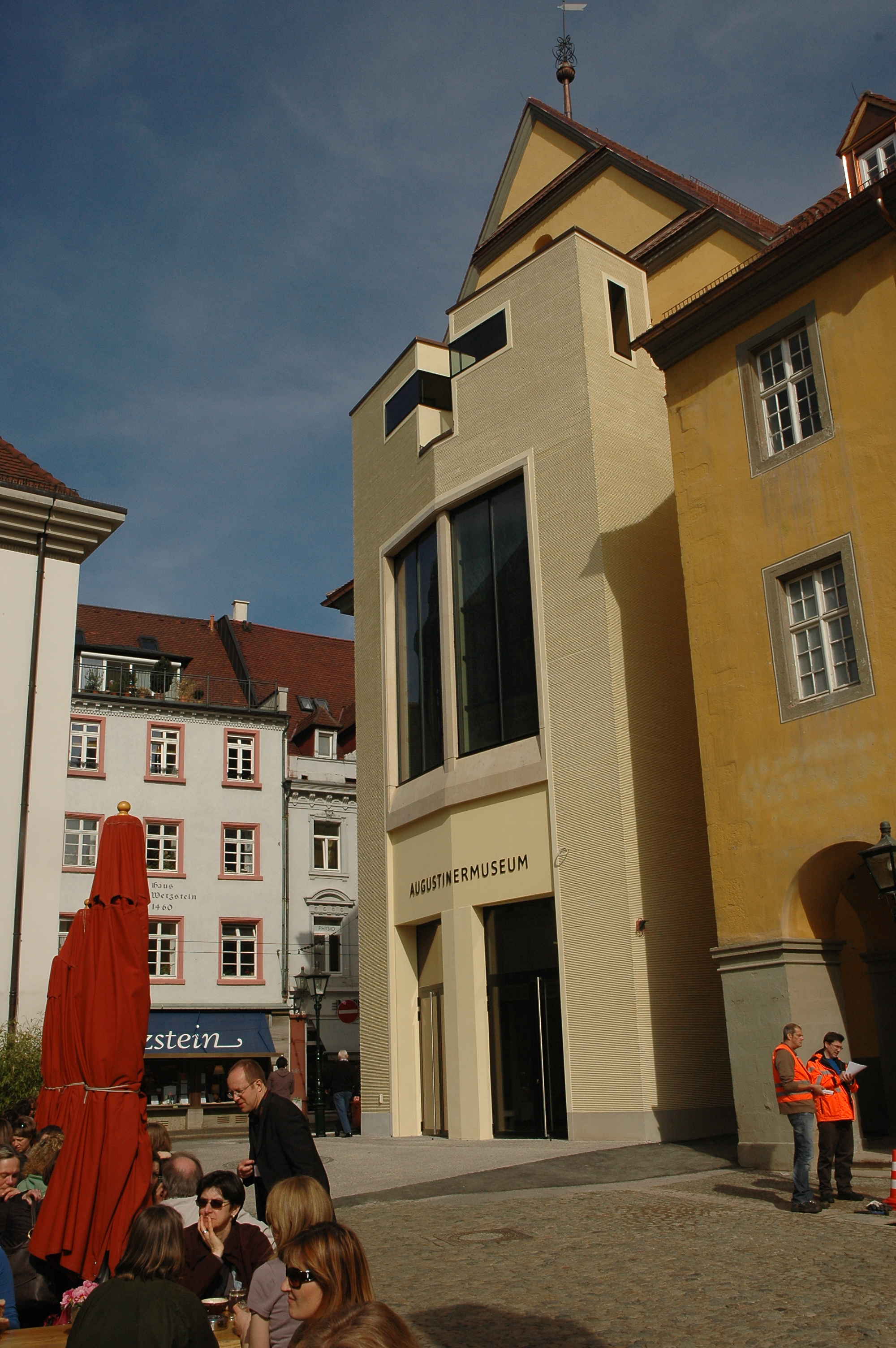
New entrance 2006

=== Building history ===
In 1278, Count Egino II authorized the construction of the monastery along with a church in the area between the Salzstraße and the city walls. The deed of foundation, dated December 6, shows that the Augustinian monks were already resident in Freiburg. In 1299, the bishop of Strassburg, Conrad de Lichtenberg, consecrated the Augustinian church. The construction of the monastery was started later at the beginning of the 14th century. Because of a delivery note from 1332 it is known that sandstone from the nearby Lorettoberg was used for the construction.

Renovations and newly constructed buildings from the 17th and 18th century in the Baroque style, as well as more modifications in the 20th century, changed the original plan of the grounds. For example, in 1706 the ceiling of the nave was raised and 10 new oval windows were added. As a further part of the modification two new chapels were installed and the original monastery along with the vestry were renovated. In 1784,Herman von Greiffenegg ordered eight Augustinian padres to move to the Franciscan friary on behalf of Emperor Joseph II. They had to take over the responsibility of the newly founded second parish St.Martin. On the other hand, the Franciscan friars who originally lived in the Franciscan monastery moved to the Augustinian.

Further renovations were started in 2006, which changed the outer appearance of the buildings again. A new entrance with a foyer was added to the west front towards the Augustinerplatz and columns were added to the former nave. Also a gallery was added that goes all around. The basement and attic were reconstructed and used as exhibition rooms. This renovation was finished in 2010.

== Notable former members ==
Some well known members of the monastic order in Freiburg were:

- Tilmann Limperger (*1485-†1490) Prior in Freiburg, provincial superior, professor and repeated dean of the University. In 1498 he became the titular bishop of Tripolis and the suffragan bishop of Basel. He preached the first reformed sermon in the Basel Minster in 1529.
- Engelbert Klüpfel (*1733 - †1811), a student from 1754 to 1756, dogmatic theology professor at the University of Freiburg
- Thomas Zeni (1707), plasterer and architect
- Thomas Zipfeli, in 1787 he became the Prior and chaplain at St.Martin constructed a city map of Freiburg

== Research ==
When in 1982 an archaeological examination of the latrine was performed, glass, pottery, wood, leather and textiles were found. Researchers dated them back to the late 13th to the 15th century. The finds are important examples of the handcraft of earlier times. The leather discoveries give a good impression of the monastery shoemaking, the glass and pottery show what kind of tableware the monastery owned, and the tools made of wood were still in good condition. Furthermore, the discoveries give an impression of the waste disposal of the time. The insights were documented in the magazine published by the group for protection of monuments Baden-Württemberg

== Bibliography ==
Van Uffelen, Chris. Contemporary Museums - Architecture, History, Collections, Braun Publishing, 2010, ISBN 978-3-03768-067-4, pages 248-251.
