= Amanda Tscherpa =

German mezzo-soprano

Amanda Tscherpa, real name Amanda Lachenwitz (1 May 1846 – September 1915), was a German operatic mezzosoprano and stage actress.

== Life ==
Born in Düsseldorf, Cherpa was trained by Minona Frieb-Blumauer and Eduard Mantius and began her stage career as a soubrette in Cologne.

Then she was engaged in Berlin, Magdeburg, Bremen, Nuremberg, Breslau, Stettin and Königsberg (East Prussia) and St. Petersburg. From 1888 until 1892, she worked at the municipal theatre of Riga, both as an opera singer and as an actress. After that, she worked in Cologne again until 1903.

Notable opera roles include Gertrud in Hans Heiling by Marschner, Marguerite in La dame blanche by Boieldieu, Mary in The Flying Dutchman, the Countess in Der Wildschütz by Lortzing, Marthe in Faust by Gounod, Marchesa in La fille du régiment by Donizetti and Edwige in Wilhelm Tell by Rossini.
