= Chris van Uffelen =

Dutch-German author and historian (born 1966)

Christian van Uffelen (born 19 December 1966 in Offenbach am Main) is a Dutch-German author and art historian, active in Stuttgart.

== Biography ==
He studied Art History at the University of Münster and afterwards at the University of Mainz, where he obtained his MA.

His focus is on medieval architecture, classical modernity and contemporary construction. He has written several newspaper articles and books on these topics as well as a great number of articles on art and architectural history, in general for encyclopedias.

== Selected works ==
- Berlin: Architecture and Design, teNeues Verlag, 2003, ISBN 978-3-82384-548-5
- Paris - The Architecture Guide (with Markus Golser), Braun Publishing, 2008, ISBN 978-3-03768-002-5
- Cinema Architecture, Braun Publishing, 2009, ISBN 978-3-03768-027-8
- Masterpieces: Bridge Architecture + Design, Braun Publishing, 2009, ISBN 978-3-03768-025-4
- Street Furniture, Aurora Production AG, 2010, ISBN 978-3-03768-043-8
- Contemporary Museums - Architecture, History, Collections, Braun Publishing, 2010, ISBN 978-3-03768-067-4
- Re-Use Architecture, Braun Publishing, 2009, ISBN 978-3-03768-064-3
- Light in Architecture - Architecture in Focus, Braun Publishing, 2011
- Airport Architecture - Architecture in Focus, Braun Publishing, 2012
