= Theater Freiburg =

Theater in Germany

Coordinates: 47°59′44″N 7°50′43″E

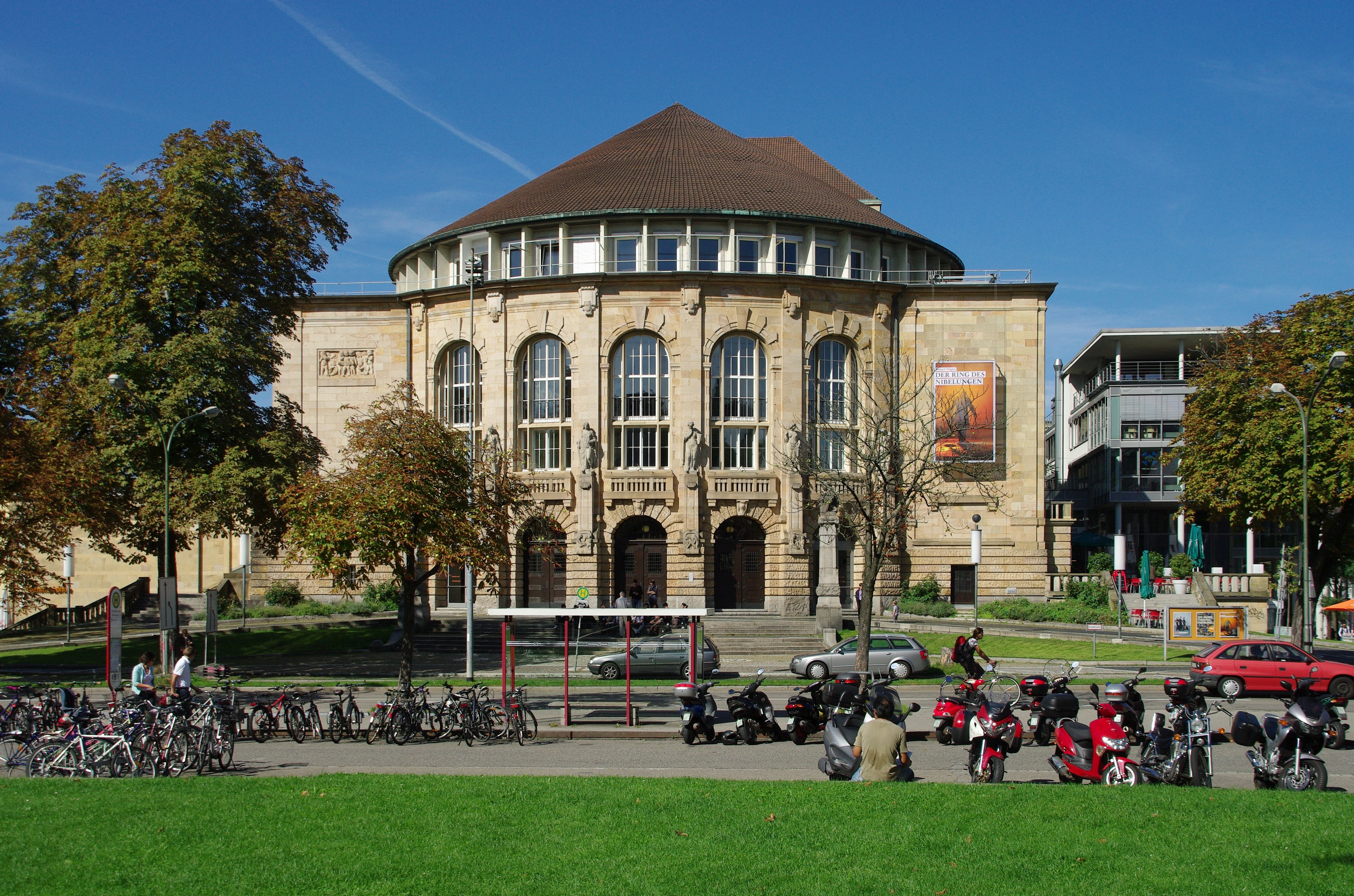
Freiburg Theatre

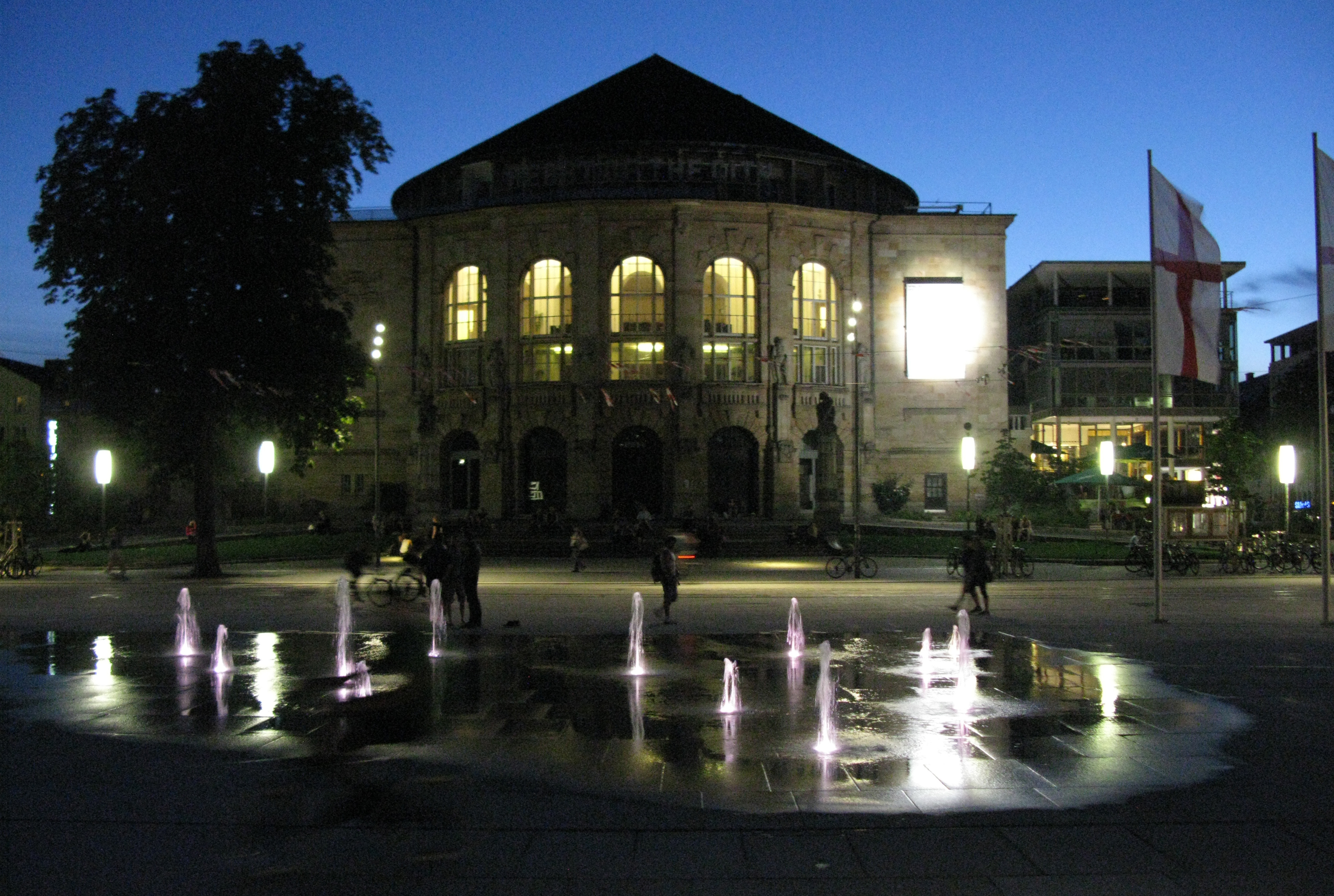
Theatre by night

Theater Freiburg is a theatre in Baden-Württemberg, Germany.

Freiburg Theatre, sometimes also referred to as Stadttheater Freiburg (Freiburg municipal theatre), formerly Städtische Bühnen (Municipal Stages) Freiburg, is the oldest and biggest theatre in Freiburg im Breisgau. It is located in Bertoldstraße, on the edge of Freiburg's historic city centre, and unites four venues under one roof: the Großes Haus (main stage), the Kleines Haus (small stage), the Kammerbühne (chamber stage) and the Werkraum (workshop). The Winterer Foyer additionally hosts author readings, such as the Litera-Tour, chambermusic concerts and evening lectures on current affairs, such as the Dream School series. Since September 2005 the theatre has been under independent ownership.

== History ==
Up until the first decades of the 19th century, theatre performances in Freiburg were mainly staged in the Kornhaus (granary) on the Münsterplatz, which later proved to be increasingly unsuitable for a “modern“ theatre. Thus it was decided to use the church of the abandoned monastery of the Augustinian hermits as the theatre. The architect Christoph Arnold was instructed to redesign the building accordingly. In 1823 the theatre was opened and the actors could return to the stage. In 1866 the “Privileged Theatre“ was taken over by the town following a decision by the district council. The first season of the current “Städtisches Theater“ (municipal theatre) opened with Lessing's Emilia Galotti.

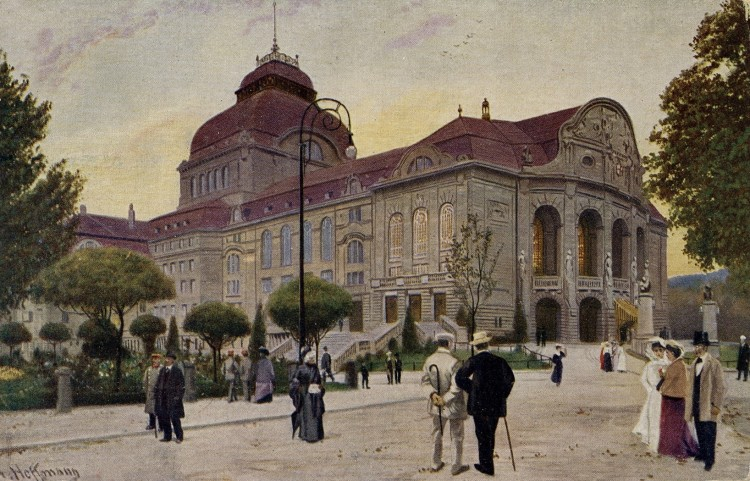
The theater in 1911

Construction of the present day theatre was started in 1905 under Otto Winterer, Lord Mayor of Freiburg at the time. It was designed by the Berlin architect Heinrich Seeling in an eclectic style combining a Neo-Baroque building with Art Nouveau decorative elements and built on the site of the former "Dauphin" bastion, part of Vauban's town fortifications. The architectural sculptures were modelled out of plaster by Hermann Feuerhahn and realised by six sculptors from Freiburg: Julius Seitz, his students Louis Granget, Theodor Hengst and August Muessle, along with Ludwig Kubanek and a Berlin colleague, Albert Mayer. The building was opened to the public on October 8, 1910, with performances of both Wallenstein's Camp by Friedrich Schiller and the “Festwiese” from Richard Wagner's The Mastersingers of Nuremberg.

During World War I performances were first reduced and finally stopped completely on September 14, 1915.

On April 14, 1917, the south front of the theatre was damaged during an air raid. In January 1919 theater performances could start again. In 1936 a new stage, the “Kammerspiele” (Chamber Theatre), opened with the performance of the play Der Brandner Kaspar schaut ins Paradies by Joseph Maria Lutz. In the summer of 1939 Joseph Schlippe, the head of the city’s building department, redesigned the auditorium completely in the Neoclassicist style typical of the Nazi era. Most of the Art Nouveau stucco was removed so that the whole room appeared in a starkly stripped-down style.

On September 1, 1944, Freiburg Theatre, like all German theatres, was shut down. A few months later, in November 1944, Freiburg was bombed and the theatre was badly damaged. Performances were resumed in October 1945 with Nathan the Wise by Gotthold Ephraim Lessing. The plays were performed in any undamaged halls in the city centre and in the Wiehre. In 1946, the Chamber Theatre moved to a new location in the Wiehre. Soon after the Second World War the original building was rebuilt by the mayor, Hoffmann. To promote the quick reconstruction of the theatre, the mayor himself put on piano concerts and so collected 120,000 German marks to finance the project.

In December 1949 the Großes Haus (main stage) reopened with a performance of Richard Wagner's The Mastersingers of Nuremberg. The lower levels of the building had been reconstructed quite simply and now housed the two cinemas Kamera (today's Winterer Foyer) and Kurbel (today's small stage) – the commercial use of the building was intended to finance further reconstruction. The Chamber Theatre in the Wiehre was abandoned in 1958, but the Kammertheater (Chamber Theatre) opened in the main theatre with Max Frisch's The Fire Raisers.

With the first renovation in 1962, a rehearsal stage was built right under the roof. In the course of this, the decorative Art Nouveau gable, which had survived until then, was removed. In 1970, the Kamera was relocated inside the building and a further stage, the podium, added to this space. In 1973, Horst Antes created a wall painting with enamel paint on metal panels attached to the huge and still provisory west front of the theatre. During the renovation and modernization between 1996 and 1998, the Kurbel ("crank") was also closed. In these rooms the Kleines Haus was subsequently installed as a performance stage. In order to do this an extension was added to the west front. In the course of reconstruction the art work by Antes had to be removed and is now, in its constituent parts, in storage. While the reconstructions were carried out, in the late 1990s, the Eschholzpark in Freiburg served as an alternative venue for the theatre.

Around 30 premieres were presented during the 2010/11 season. One can choose from hundreds of performances every year. Freiburg Theater, under its managing director Barbara Mundel, and the slogan, “What kind of future do we want to live in?”, seeks dialogue with the city, searching for answers, models and opportunities.

The scheduled reconstruction of the stagecraft, which is estimated at around 9 million euros, is currently being looked into due to a lack of financial means within Freiburg's cultural budget.

== Performers ==
Freiburg Theatre houses three of the performing arts: opera, theatre and dance, as well as a choir and the Freiburg Philharmonic Orchestra, which, along with performing with the opera, also gives concerts in the Großes Haus and in the neighbouring Konzerthaus (concert house).

The Werkraum (workshop) is an open studio for the Youth Theatre Group and an experimental laboratory dedicated to questions and issues of our times. A current example is the Family Conference - a research project dealing with the topic of education over a time span of more than 100 years.

Questions concerning politics are central on the Kammerbühne (chamber stage). There, The Stronghold of Europe is being looked at from various perspectives. A number of events and theatre layouts are concerned with questions such as: Who decides who is allowed to live here? What we are talking about when we talk about Europe? Who belongs to Europe?

In addition, the theatre makes an effort to support young authors and directors by providing opportunities for students, such as the student group Frischfleisch (fresh blood), and their own youth club.

== Directors ==
since 2017 Peter Carp
