= Waldsee (Freiburg im Breisgau) =

Quarter of Freiburg im Breisgau, Germany

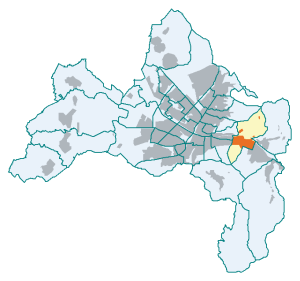
Freiburg im Breisgau - District Waldsee

Waldsee (German pronunciation: [ˈvaltˌzeː]) is an eastern district of Freiburg im Breisgau, Baden-Württemberg, Germany, with a population of around 5,400 inhabitants. It is named after the local recreational area of the same name. It lies between the districts Wiehre and Oberau in the west and Littenweiler and Ebnet in the east. In the north and the south, it is bordered by the Dreisam Valley mountains. The Dreisam flows through Waldsee from the east to the west and forms the northern boundary of the residential development area here.

== History ==
The history of the area begins after the First World War when the area between the city and the village of Littenweiler, which was independent until 1914 and had been largely used for agriculture until then, was gradually developed into the style of a garden city. Previously, there was only the Carthusian monastery on the north side of the valley and the Zum Schiff inn, which was built in 1777 on the road leading into the Black Forest. On the south side, a recreational area with a pub for visitors had been created in around 1900, which was based around a small former ice pond that gave the area its name, the Waldsee. The football stadium for the Freiburg Football Club was also built nearby. A long since abandoned stop on the railway line Höllentalbahn passing nearby made these facilities easily accessible. From 1905, this was also the terminus (which had the first reversing loop) of a tram line that was to be extended in the direction of Littenweiler in 1925, which provided good access to the emerging Waldsee district.

Between the two world wars, numerous streets were laid out and developed in the area that extends from the Schiff inn up to approximately where the Holy Trinity Church is today, where there was predominatingly a low building-density with large gardens. Various sports facilities were built in the 1930s alongside the river Dreisam, including a building belonging to the University in 1925 with a red-brick sports hall, designed by architect Hermann Alker based on the Bauhaus style. To the east of the sports facilities, the leisure pool Strandbad was built in 1934, which at the time, was one of the most modern open air swimming pools in southern Germany. Because of the lack of separation between the men’s and women’s baths, there were initially protests from the side of the Catholic Church. In 1939 the area named Freiburg-Ost was divided into the four districts of Oberwiehre, Oberau, Waldsee and Littenweiler (although Littenweiler had already been a separate district before that).

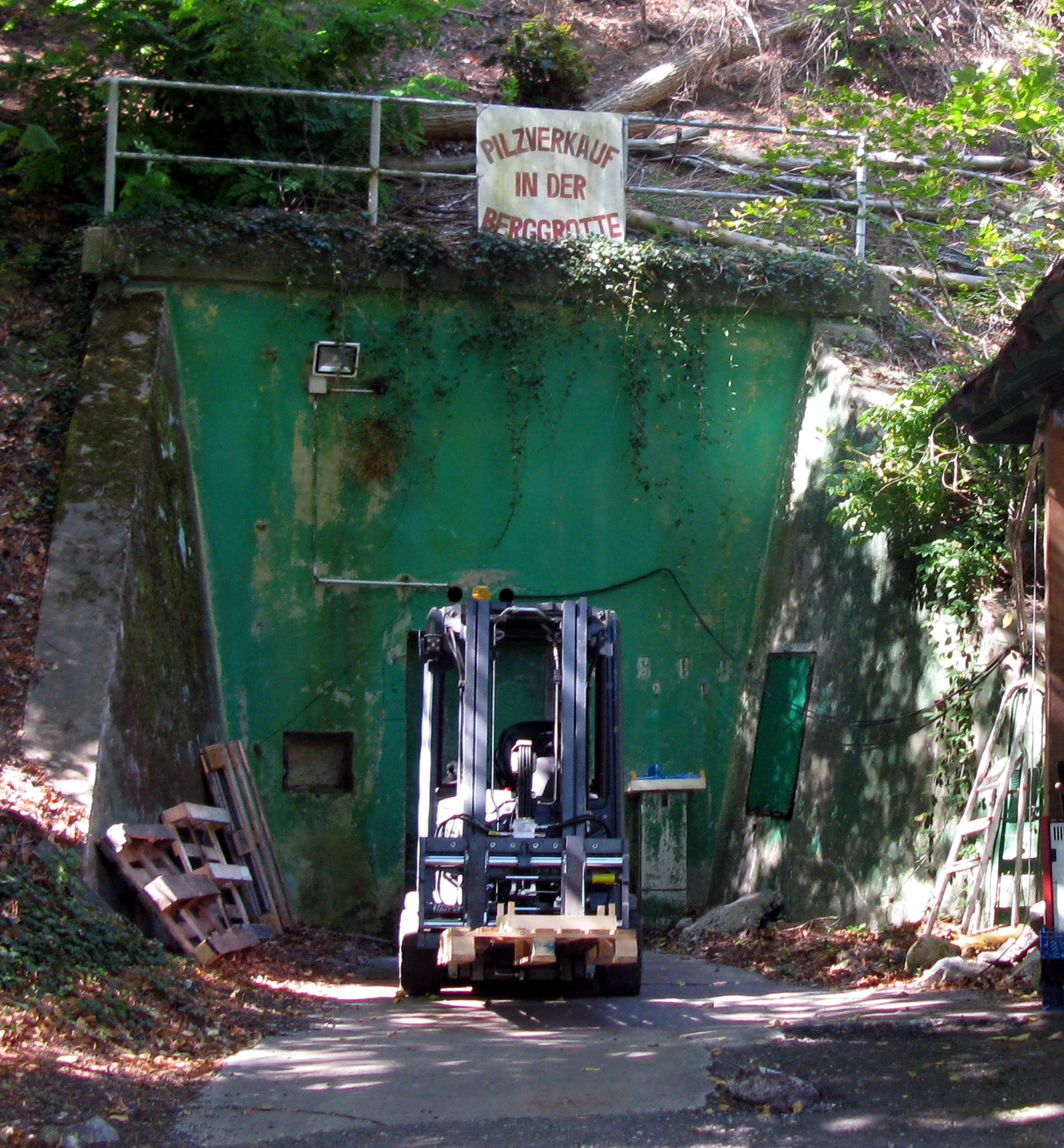
Entrance Hirzberg bunker

In the 1950s, housing construction was continued to the east until it adjoined on to the Littenweiler district in the 1960s. In the 1990s, the district made a name for itself with numerous, sometimes violent, protests against the planned and later completed new construction of the federal highway B 31. The new road was supposed to relieve residential areas of long-distance traffic, which was achieved, but it also created new difficulties for other residents and reduced the high recreational value of the district, aside from the fact that this new road consisting of four lanes and free of intersections brings additional, burdensome long-distance traffic into the city.

== Hirzberg Bunker ==
The Hirzberg bunker is located in the Schlossberg at the Karthäuser Street 117, beneath the Johannisheim. It was created in the 1940s for the headquarters of the local air raid precaution department, which solely served for military purposes. There, female assistants from the armed forces served as SS radio operators, among other things. The bunker was equipped with a central heating system and parquet flooring. After the war, the French did not blow up the bunker, like they did with others. Since it was too humid for civilian purposes, it started to deteriorate at first. In the 1990s Peter Metzger leased the bunker from the Federation to grow mushrooms. Since then, he has been growing ten to fifteen kinds of mushrooms at a constant humidity and temperature of around 18 degrees. These mushrooms are being sold in front of the bunker, at markets and to restaurants.

== Along the Dreisam ==
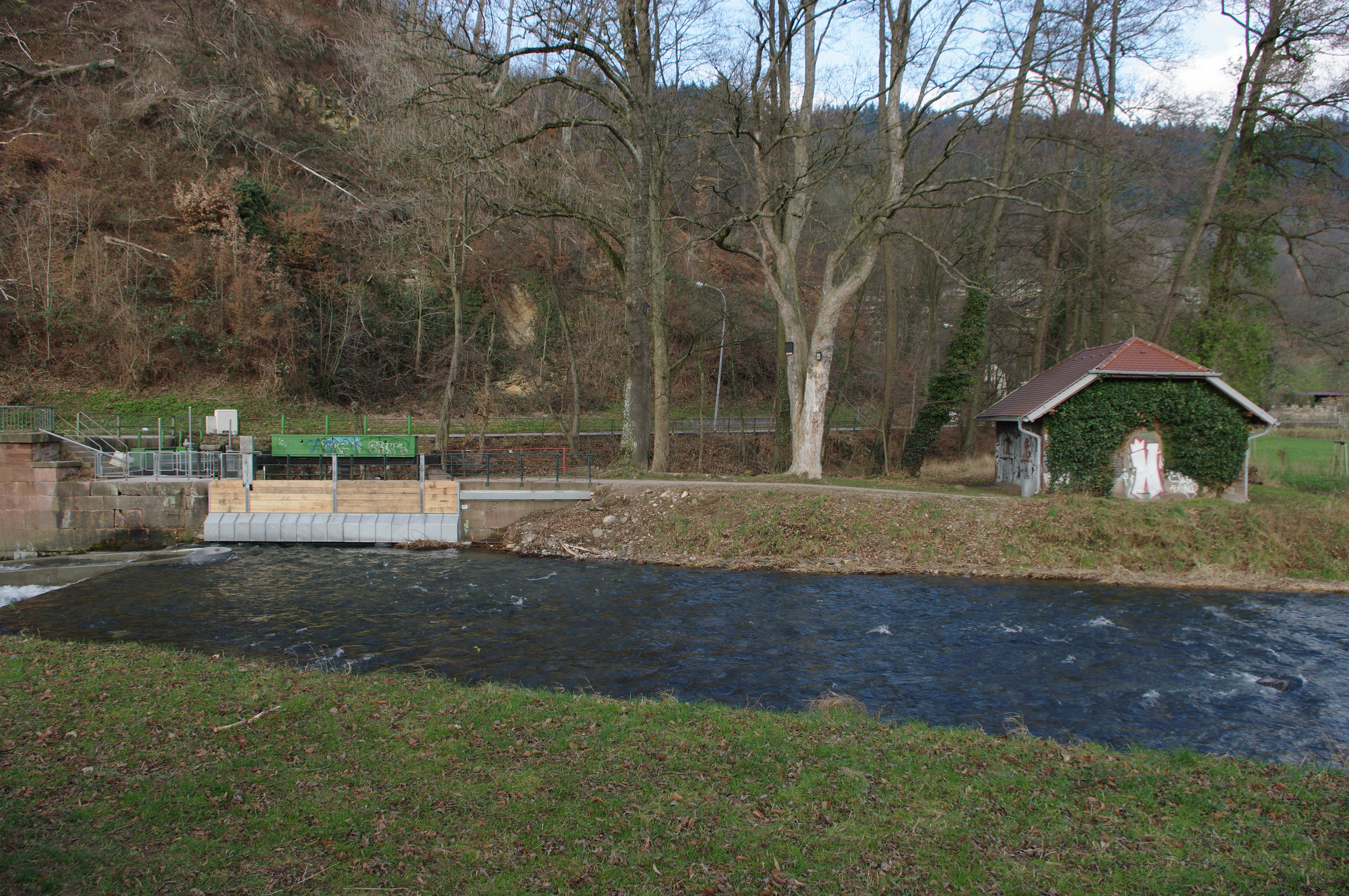
River Dreisam (area of the former sand trap)

Sand trap

In the north-east of the district, the sand trap is located on the river Dreisam; here, the river was channelled into a basin to let the sand and gravel that has been carried along settle. This facility does not exist anymore. At this point, there is a bridge leading over the river. Directly westwards the bridge, at the left side of the river bank, a power station was constructed in 2008. This powerhouse produces around 300,000 kWh of electricity per year, which can cover the demand of 120 households. The hydropower screw turbine, which produces the electricity, is eight metres long and has a diameter of 3.10 metres. Therefore, it is one of the largest facilities of this kind in Germany.

Directly east of the bridge, the trade canal is diverted to the right side of the river, which provided energy as far back as the middle ages for industry (including mills, garnet grinding workshops, tannery and dye factories) and for the old town of Freiburg in both the south and east. Today, the water from the canal is used for the operation of multiple small power plants. The water from this canal in the Oberau district is also diverted into the Freiburger Bächle.
