= Wiehre =

Residential district in Freiburg im Breisgau, Germany

Coordinates: 47°59′05.60″N 7°51′07.00″E

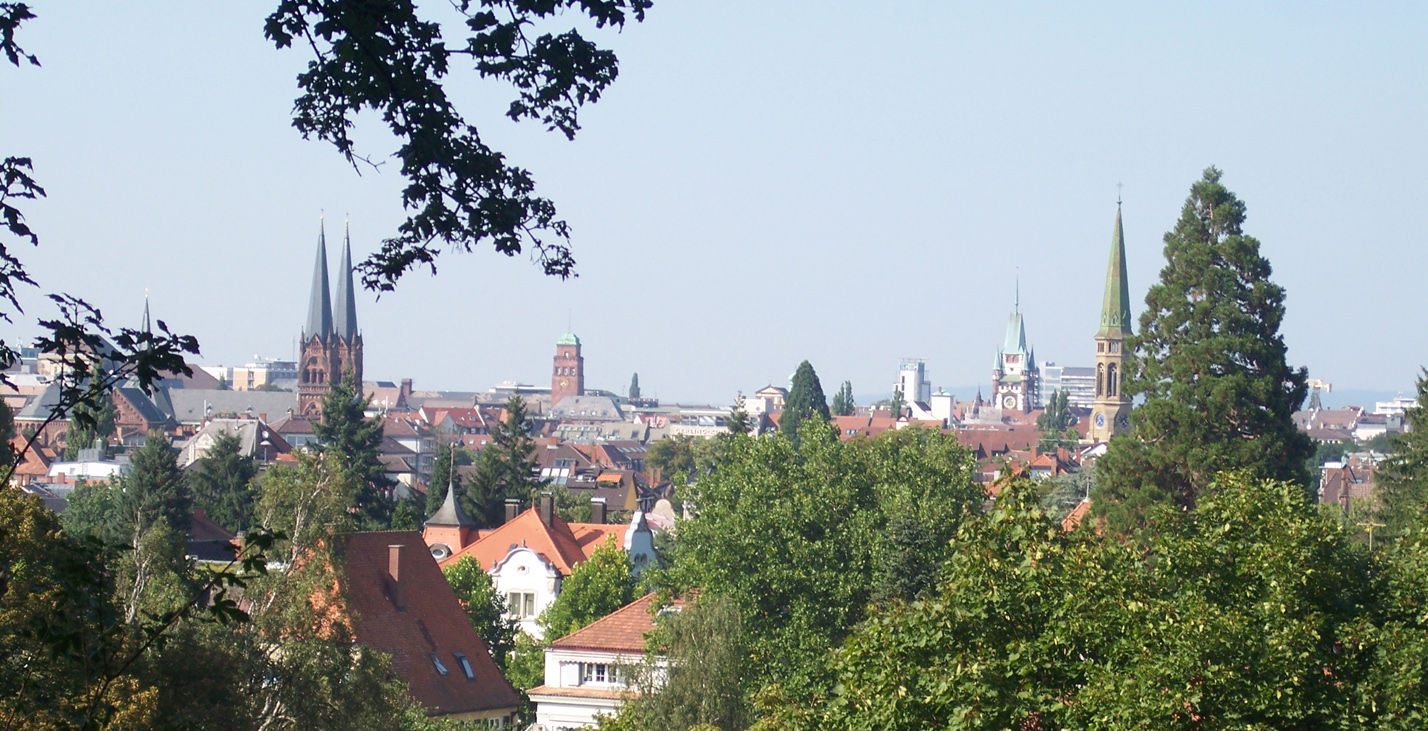
View from Bromberg on the Wiehre, from left to right: John Church, University Tower, Martinstor, Christ Church

Wiehre (German pronunciation: [ˈviːʁə]; preceded in German with the definite article die: "die Wiehre") is a residential district at the edge of Freiburg im Breisgau, located southwards and across the River Dreisam from the Old City. It is a desirable district, with comparatively quiet streets and many well-preserved commercial and residential buildings dating from the 18th century and earlier. Housing there is expensive relative to the rest of the city. The Wiehre is bordered on the west by the Rheintalbahn Karlsruhe-Basel, on the north by the Dreisam, on the east by the Waldsee (another district of Freiburg), and on the south by a wood known as the Sternwald am Bromberg and the village of Günterstal (which also belongs to Freiburg). The Günterstal Landstrasse, which begins at the St. Martin's Gate in the ancient town wall, bisects the Wiehre.

The Wiehre itself consists of 421 Oberwiehre, 422 Mittelwiehre, 423 Unterwiehre-Nord and 424 Unterwiehre-Süd. Its total population is 24,634 (2020).

== History ==
The name "Wiehre" comes from "Wehre", which referred to the dikes erected near the Dreisam, in the area later known as the Oberwiehre, in order to gain arable land from the floodplain. “Die Wiehre” is mentioned as a placename in a communication (1008 C.E.) from King Heinrich II to the Bishop of Basel. In this area was located the village of Adelshausen, which because of its exposed position before the city walls was frequently plundered and finally destroyed altogether.

The Wiehre was already incorporated into the rapidly growing city of Freiburg in 1825.

In addition to agricultural buildings, a small commercial and artisans’ district grew along the Dreisam, along with a small brewery. With the economic upturn of the Archduchy of Baden in the middle of the 19th century, as a rising middle and upper-middle class required space for homes, the Wiehre began to develop into a posh residential district. Among the residents were pensioners from North Baden and the Ruhr, which at that time was much afflicted with cholera epidemics, and the wealthy established second homes in Freiburg, where the water was comparatively well protected.

These influential residents are responsible for the spur line (Höllentalbahn) which bisects the district. The train was also used by the Ganter Brewery, which was erected in 1888 on the site of an oilpress, and which grew into the largest brewery in South Baden.

In 1899, two landmarks of the town were erected: the Johanneskirche (Catholic), which because of its impressive appearance is called the "Wiehredom," and the second Evangelische Church in Freiburg, the Christuskirche. The Loretto Hill, which reaches into Freiburg, began to be heavily built over at the beginning of the 20th century, including impressive villas and a private hospital.

Up until the 1920s, the streets were extended southwards, and the Wiehre with them. The Höllentalbahn tracks began to be seen as an obstacle, and were removed 1933–34, marking the present southern boundary of the Wiehre. The old train station still exists, now in use as a café and culture-center.

During the Nazi era, the Wiehre was the center of a minor resistance. The underground group met in a private home near the Christuskirche, to lay plans for a post-Hitler Germany.

The Wiehre emerged from the Second World War relatively unscathed; only homes near the Old City were damaged.

After the war, the dramatic increase in motor traffic required the expansion of the Schwarzwaldstraße into a major artery, although the Wiehre retained most of its traditional architectural character.

== Life in the Wiehre ==
Primarily because of the high prices for rent and real estate, the Wiehre is primarily a residential area for academics and the upper middle class. The majority of living spaces consists of villas, townhouses, and apartment buildings with spacious accommodations. Within the Wiehre are many shops, especially eco-alternative boutiques, as well as other shops and pubs. A farmer's market is held weekly at the old Wiehrebahnhof. The main shopping street is the rather heavily trafficked Günterstalstraße, which connects Freiburg with Schauinsland; traffic has been somewhat reduced in recent years by the creation of a network of one-way streets. While several student associations maintain tradition-rich dwellings in the Wiehre, the district remains the dream of many Freiburgers.

== Infrastructure ==
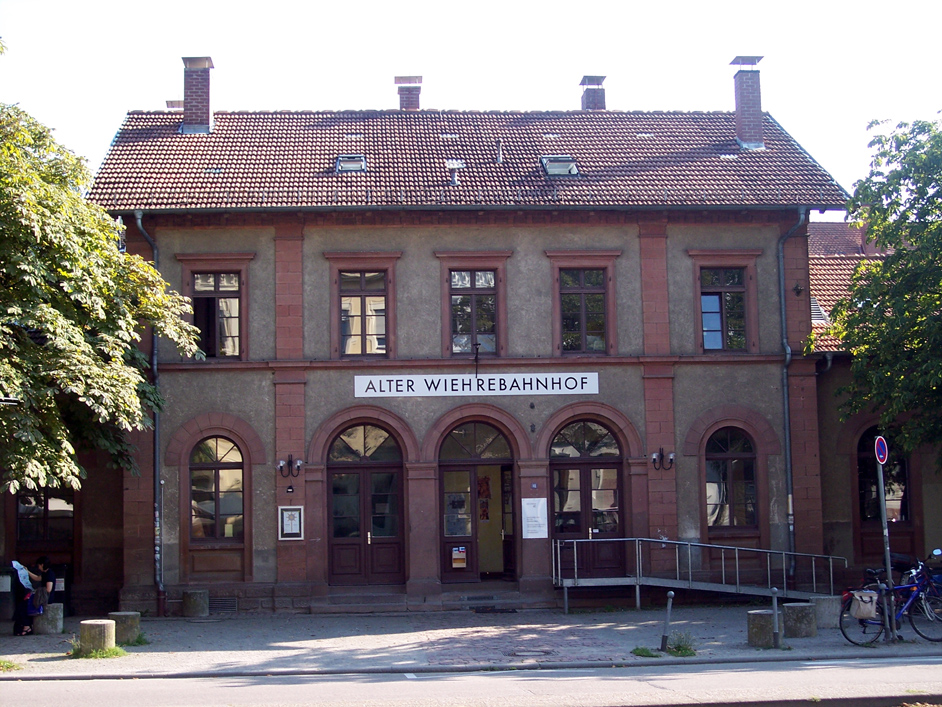
The Alter Wiehrebahnhof on Urachstraße, formerly the Freiburg-Wiehre train station

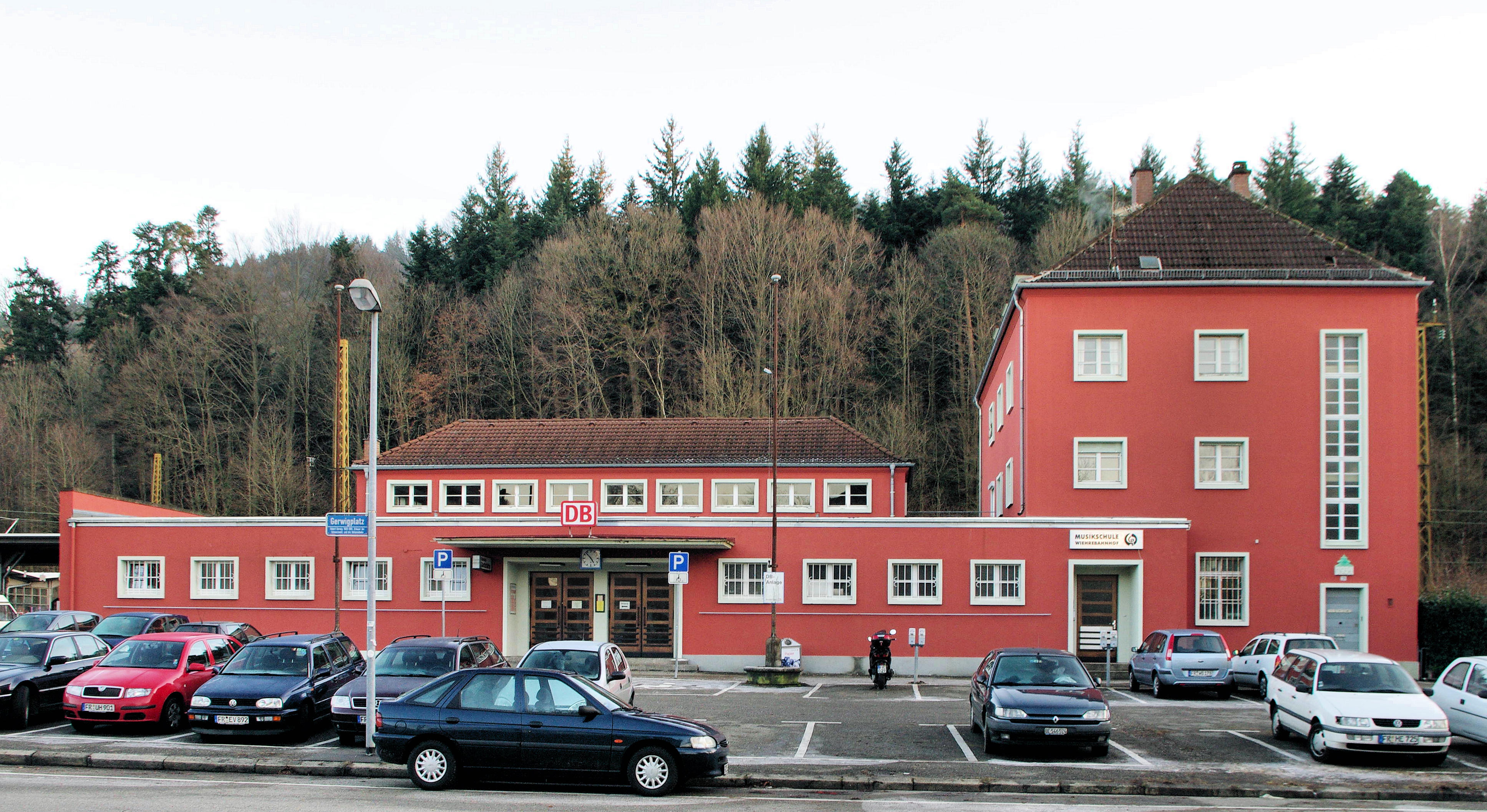
The reception building of the new station at the Freiburg-Wiehre Höllentalbahn of 1934

The Wiehre is connected by the Höllentalbahn to Freiburg and Titisee. Additionally, the town is served by numerous bus routes, and the streetcars connect the Wiehre with the Old City of Freiburg, with Günterstal and Vauban.

Schools include the Walter-Eucken-Gymnasium, the Rotteckgymnasium, the Turnsee-, Loretto- and Lessingschule as well as the Waldorfschule. Additionally there is the Gertrud-Luckner-Gewerbeschule and the Max-Planck-Institut für ausländisches und internationales Strafrecht.

At the foot of the Loretto Hill is one of the largest hospitals in the city, the Catholic Loretto-Krankenhaus. Next to it is the Loretto Baths, an old public pool with a still-treasured "Damenbad".The old train station contains a small cultural center, where the communal cinema has often been recognized for the excellence of its programs; it has been home as well since 2003 to the Literaturforum Südwest.
