= History of the Jews in Freiburg im Breisgau =

The History of the Jews in Freiburg dates back to the Late Middle Ages when, at the site of today's Wasserstraße and Weberstraße, there was reference to a ghetto. In 1328, a synagogue was located at 6 Weberstraße.

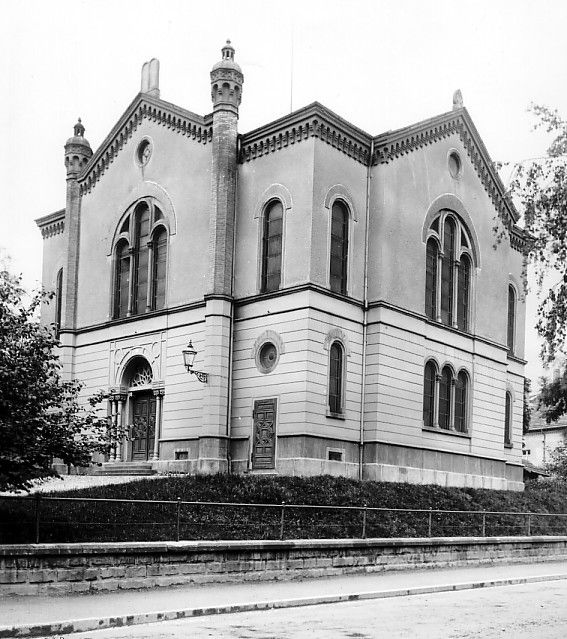
Former Old Freiburg Synagogue ca. 1869/78 which was destroyed on 10 November 1938 during Kristallnacht

== The Middle Ages ==
From as early as 1310, the Counts of Freiburg had acquired the lucrative Schutzjude from the Emperor, but the taxes paid were not enough for them, meaning that Count Konrad II had amassed 400 silver marks in debts in 1326. Probably because of this dependence, Konrad, alongside his co-ruling son Friedrich, issued a comprehensive writ of protection for the city's inhabitants on 12 October 1338 in order to avert damages from the Counts.

When, in 1348, the plague spread across the territory of the German Reich, the writ of protection suddenly no longer applied. On 1 January 1349, before the plague had spread to the Upper Rhine, suspicious Jews were arrested in Freiburg at the instigation of the city council for well poisoning. Whilst being tortured, most of them denied the allegations and accused Jews from other areas through mortal fear. After a pogrom took place at the beginning of January 1349 in Basel, with the exception of pregnant women, all Jews living in Freiburg were burned on the Friday before Candlemas Day on 31 January due to their misdeeds and murders, which they had instigated and admitted to. The children of those who had been executed were forced to be baptised.

In 1360, the city council allowed the Jews to resettle, but there was great uncertainty and at the request of the city on 14 September 1394, the Austrian landlord, Duke Leopold IV, issued an order stating that all Jews had to wear Jewish hats and jackets. They also prohibited the wearing of liturgical colours such as red and green and prohibited them from Easter Week. As a result of news of ritual killings against Christians in distant Bavaria, on 4 July 1401, the city council, after consulting Duke Leopold, announced the expulsion of all Jews from the pulpits. The councillors solemnly signed the decree dekein Jude ze Friburg niemmerme sin sol (no Jews may set foot in Freiburg ever again). Jews were only allowed to stay in Freiburg with the aid of a municipal court and an hourly fee. From 1411 onwards, Jews were accepted again in Freiburg, but during the time of the imperial city (1415-1527), King Sigismund officially confirmed the decree of 1401 with the Eternal Expulsion in 1424.

== Enlightenment and the 19th century ==
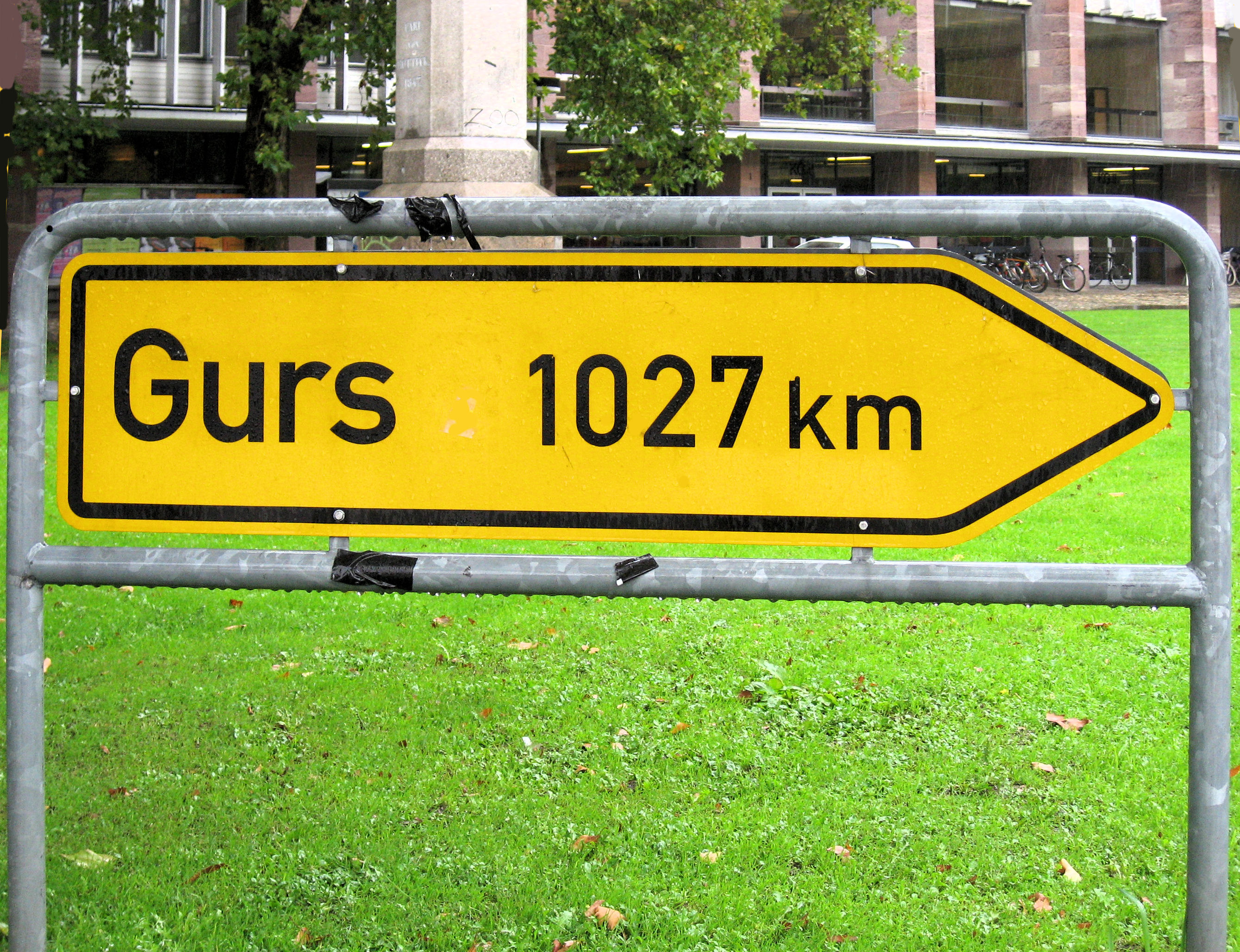
Memorial to the deportation of Freiburg's Jews to the Gurs internment camp (in southern France) in the form of a traffic sign

The situation regarding the Jews only changed when Emperor Joseph II proclaimed the Patent of Toleration in 1782. The patent formally lifted the existing "Jewish laws" but there were still restrictions on Jewish people's everyday lives. Although Jews were now allowed to attend higher schools and universities, they were still not considered as full-time citizens in Freiburg. In 1809, the city council assigned a Jewish inn to the Jews in Grünwälderstraße. The inn's first tenant was the first Jewish citizen of Freiburg.

In 1830, when Leopold, Grand Duke of Baden, who recognized the constitutional monarchy as a learned political scientist, had taken office, the state parliament debated about the emancipation of the Jews. There was however resistance to the debates of 1831 in the second chamber. Karl von Rotteck, in particular, became the spokesman for the representatives, who had demanded that the Jews deserved extended rights with increased integration. in 1835, the Grand Duke abolished all special charges against the Jews. As late as 1862, there was fierce resistance in Freiburg, especially against the freedom of movement. The merchants in particular wanted to keep the banning of the Jews in Freiburg, which had existed since 1425 and confirmed in 1809, in fear of competition. In a petition to the state parliament, it was said that we are become a nest for Jews.

Between 1869 and 1870, the Old Synagogue was built according to plans set out by Georg Jakob Schneider in Rempartstraße (later Werthmannplatz, now the Platz der Alten Synagoge). In 1870, the Jewish Cemetery in Freiburg was first used and is still in use to this day.

== National Socialism ==
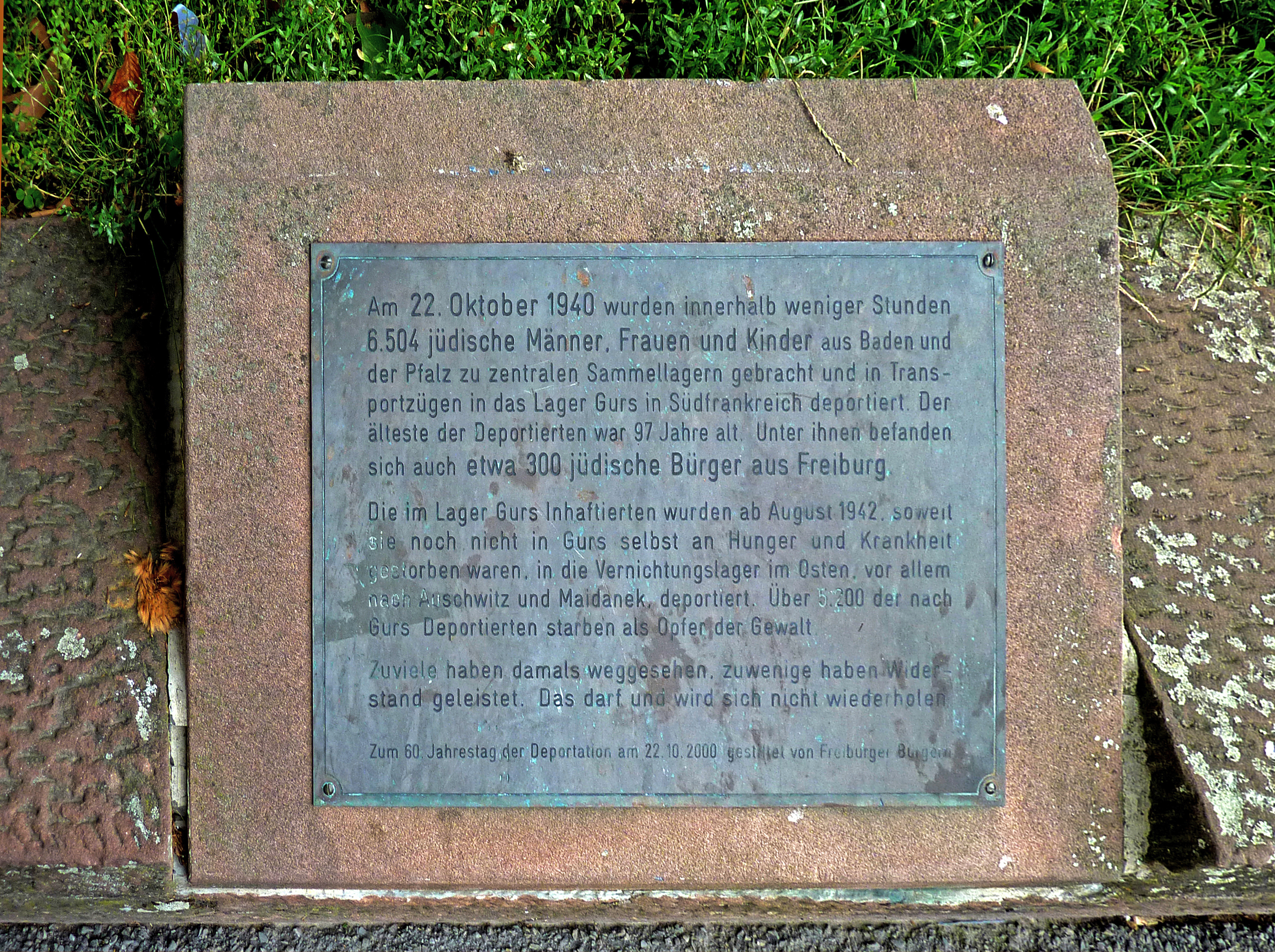
Commemorative plaque „Wagner-Bürckel“ campaign at the Platz der alten Synagoge

At the end of January 1933 in Berlin, the seizing of control by the National Socialists quickly spread through Freiburg. On 6 March, the Nazis, without the consent of Mayor Karl Bender, hoisted the Swastika flag at Freiburg's City Hall. On 17 March, between 4 and 5 o'clock, the Social Democratic and Jewish parliamentary representative Christian Daniel Nußbaum was arrested, who then fatally injured a police officer with a shot through the apartment door. In the course of events, the publishing house of Volkswacht (Freiburg), or People's Guard, was stormed by members of the NSDAP, SA, SS and Der Stahlhelm, who threw 16,000 freshly printed newspapers onto the street and tried to light them. Journalist and Social Democrat Käthe Vordtriede thereby lost her job. On 18 March, all local organisations of the SPD and KPD, including their auxiliary and subsidiary organisations, were dissolved in Freiburg.

On 28 March 1933, the Jewish SPD city councillor Max Mayer resigned his mandate as a result of the Provisional Law on the Coordination of the States with the Reich. On 31 March 1933, SPD city councillor Robert Grumbach also resigned his mandate for the same reason. The Nazi boycott of Jewish businesses was only followed halfheartedly by the citizens of Freiburg.

As in many places across Germany, during the Kristallnacht on 10 November 1938, the Old Synagogue went up in flames. Subsequently, 100 men aged 18 or older were taken to Dachau concentration camp north of Munich for "protective custody" and immigration detention.

On 22 October 1940, as across Baden, the deportation of the Jews took place in Freiburg in accordance to the framework set out by the Wagner-Bürckel campaign. They were originally taken to Gurs internment camp near the Spanish border in France and then later to the extermination camps.

Numerous "Stolpersteine" were installed across Freiburg as a way of recollecting those taken to the camps. The project "Vordtriede-Haus Freiburg" is devoted to the journalist Käthe Vordtriede and her children who had emigrated. She was the first female journalist of the newspaper Volkswacht. In the city district of Rieselfeld, a street was named after her in 2003.

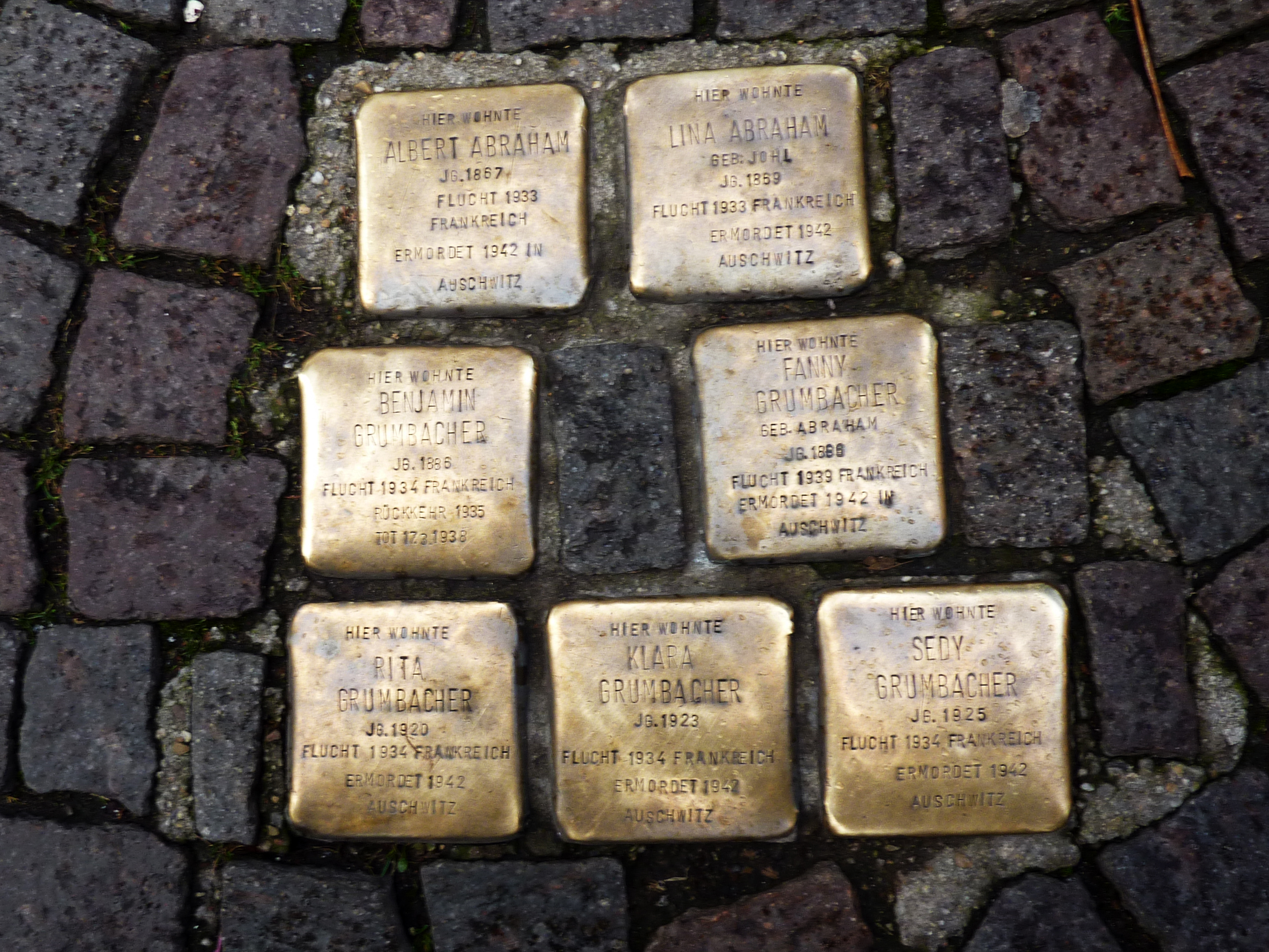
Stolpersteine for the Abraham and Grumbacher families, Eisenbahnstraße 66

== Modern times ==
On 7 September 1945, a Jewish worship service took place in Freiburg for the first time in five years. For this purpose, the city provided a room at the Historical Merchants' Hall. The Israeli Rural Community of South Baden founded in Freiburg at the end of 1945, had its headquarters located on Hansjakobstraße 8.

On 11 November 1947 the city made former city councilor, Robert Grumbach, the deputy for all Jews in Freiburg, an honorary citizen.

On 1 December 1948, the city and state carried out a settlement with the Jewish community, according to which the city would remain the owner of the former synagogue site. In return, the city undertook a restoration of the Jewish cemetery, the walled-in cemetery and the building of a guard house with a cemetery hall.

In 1953, the rabbis of the Jewish community, supported by the French military, set up a prayer room on Holbeinstraße 25. The number of Jews living in Freiburg in 1968 was 225. On 16 June 1985, the foundations were laid for a new synagogue, which was opened on 5 November 1985. It was built near the minster on land which the city had provided free of charge. The city paid over one million Deutschmarks for the construction costs, the state provided a further 3.5 million out of the 7 million Deutschmarks required.

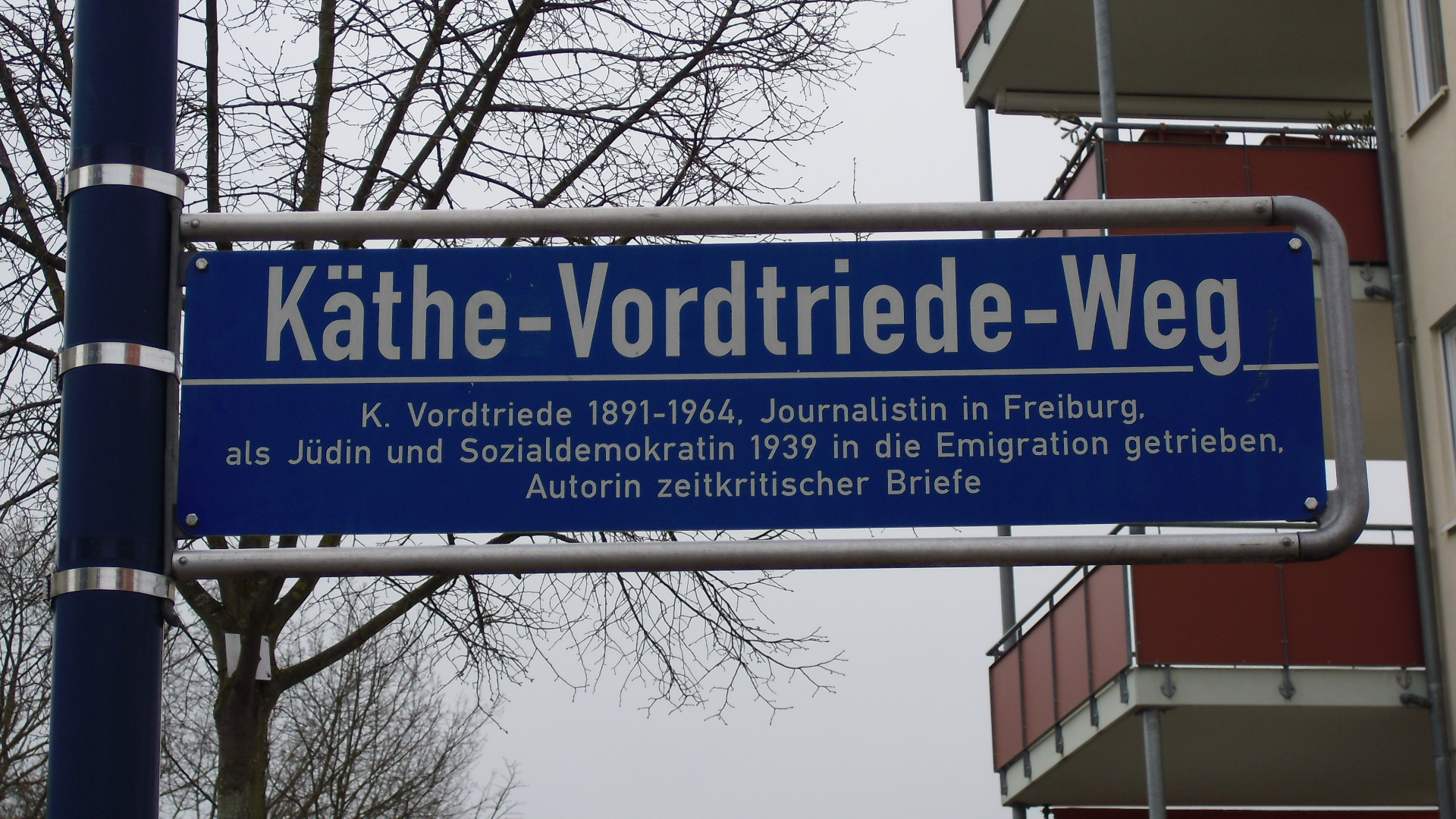
Käthe-Vordtriede-Weg in Rieselfeld

At present, the Orthodox Israeli community in Freiburg has about 750 active members. Alongside this, the egalitarian Jewish Chawurah Gescher community is also active in Freiburg.

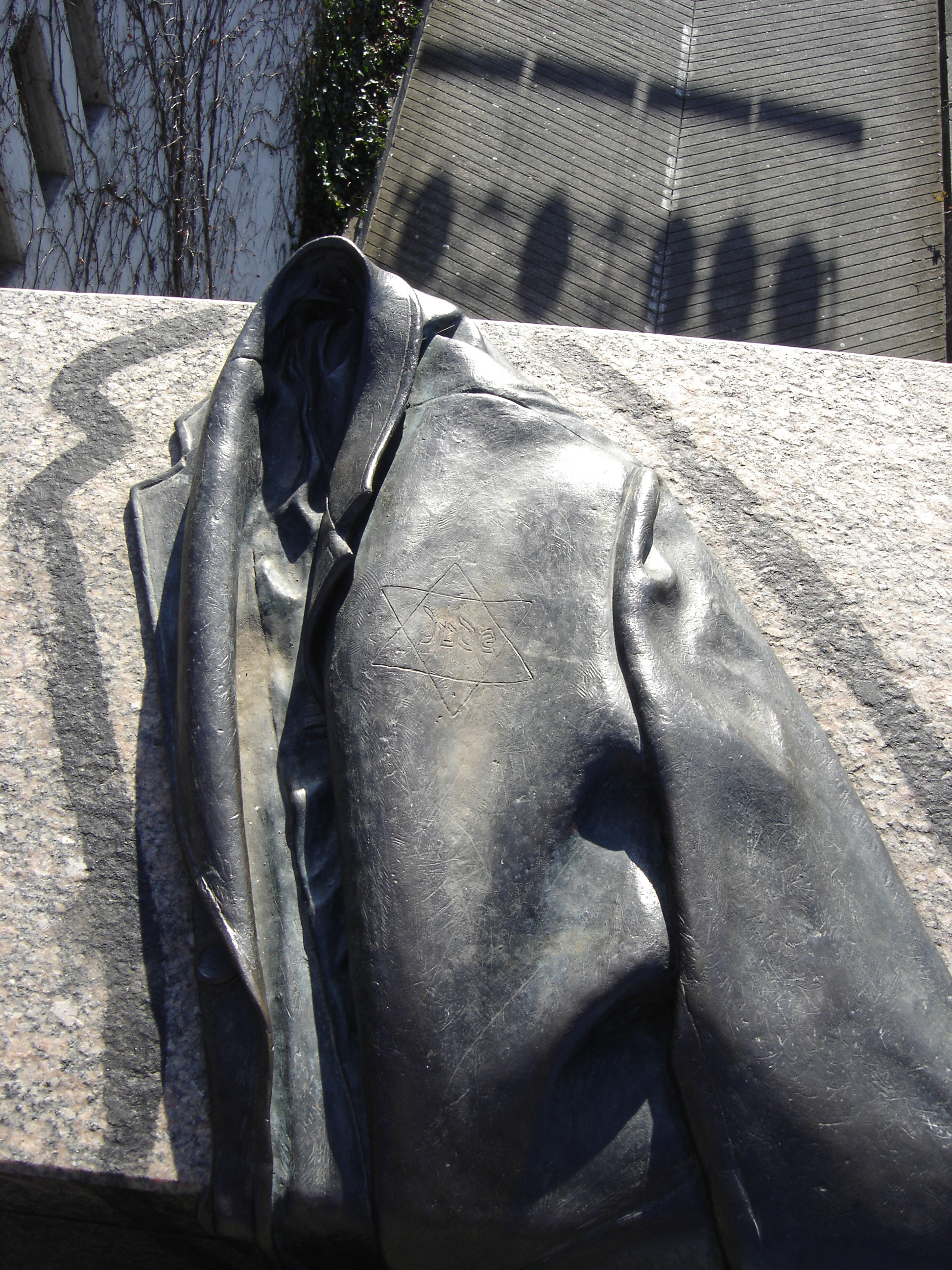
Monument to the murdered Jews at the Wiwilí bridge
