= Vitaly Margulis =

Ukrainian-born classical pianist and music educator

Vitaly Margulis Віталій Маргуліс
- Born: 16 April 1928; Kharkiv, Ukrainian SSR, Soviet Union
- Died: 29 May 2011 (aged 83) Los Angeles, California, U.S.
- Genre: Classical music
- Occupations: Pianist; Music educator; Musicologist; Writer
- Instrument: Piano
- Academic appointments: Hochschule für Musik Freiburg (1975–1994); University of California, Los Angeles (1994–2011)

Vitaly Iosifovich Margulis (Note: Ukrainian: Віталій Йосипович Маргуліс, romanized: Vitalii Yosypovych Marhulis; Russian: Виталий Иосифович Маргулис, romanized: Vitaly Iosifovich Margulis) (16 April 1928 – 29 May 2011) was a Ukrainian-born classical pianist, music educator, musicologist and writer. He held teaching appointments at the Leningrad Conservatory, the Hochschule für Musik Freiburg and the University of California, Los Angeles (UCLA). His career combined international concert performances with research into musical interpretation, particularly the works of Johann Sebastian Bach and Ludwig van Beethoven.

In Freiburg, Margulis co-founded the international piano masterclass Russische Schule (Russian School) in 1977. The programme developed into a recurring event combining advanced piano instruction with public performances at the city's Historisches Kaufhaus. Its tradition was subsequently continued by the Internationale Klavier Akademie Freiburg under the direction of his son, pianist Jura Margulis.

== Early life and education ==
Margulis was born on 16 April 1928 in Kharkiv, then part of the Ukrainian Soviet Socialist Republic. He received his first piano lessons from his father, Iosif Margulis, a pianist whose own teacher, Alexander Horowitz, had studied with Alexander Scriabin. Alexander Horowitz was also an uncle of the pianist Vladimir Horowitz. Through this musical background, Margulis was introduced to a pianistic tradition closely associated with Scriabin's music.

During the Second World War, Margulis and his family fled eastward from the German invasion of the Soviet Union, spending part of the war in Central Asia. He subsequently entered the Leningrad Conservatory, where he studied piano under Samary Savshinsky, an influential representative of the Leningrad piano school.

Margulis graduated from the Leningrad Conservatory in 1951. Savshinsky's approach to piano interpretation, emphasizing careful examination of the musical text and the relationship between technical execution and artistic conception, remained an important influence on Margulis's subsequent work as a performer and teacher.

== Career ==
=== Early career in the Soviet Union ===
After completing his conservatory studies in 1951, Margulis began his professional career with the Ural Philharmonic, performing throughout the Soviet Union. Although he had already established himself as a promising young pianist, he was not admitted to postgraduate study at the Leningrad Conservatory and consequently left the city to pursue his concert career.

In 1958, he returned to Leningrad and was appointed to teach piano at the conservatory. He also performed as a soloist with the Leningrad concert organization Lenconcert. During his Soviet career, he gave more than 1,000 concerts, principally in regional cities and concert venues.

According to his former student and biographer Lidia Volchek, Margulis faced institutional obstacles in seeking opportunities at international piano competitions and in obtaining academic promotion. Volchek associated some of these difficulties with antisemitism in Soviet musical institutions. Nevertheless, he maintained an active performing and teaching career, with repertoire including Bach, Beethoven, Frédéric Chopin, Robert Schumann and Scriabin.

In 1965, Margulis suffered a heart attack that significantly influenced his musical interests. He later recalled that the experience led him to reconsider the emotionally demanding Romantic repertoire that had previously dominated his performances. He devoted several years to studying and performing Bach's music, an experience that contributed to his later investigations of its religious and symbolic dimensions.

=== Emigration and career in Western Europe ===
Margulis emigrated from the Soviet Union in 1974, initially settling in Italy. During this period, he studied organ music and had opportunities to play historic church organs, including instruments in Rome. The German harpsichordist Stanislav Heller helped arrange a performance for him in Freiburg im Breisgau, which contributed to his establishment in West Germany.

In 1975, he was appointed professor of piano at the Hochschule für Musik Freiburg, where he taught until 1994. Alongside his academic work, he developed an international performing career, appearing in major musical centres throughout Europe, Asia and North America.

His international performances included concerts in New York, Los Angeles, Rome, Berlin, Salzburg, Amsterdam and Tokyo. He appeared at the Salzburg Festival in 1991. He subsequently returned to perform in Russia, giving concerts in Moscow and Saint Petersburg in 1994 and 1995.

Reviews of his performances frequently emphasized his interpretations of Beethoven and Scriabin. His repertoire continued to include a wide range of Classical and Romantic music, while his interest in Bach's keyboard works remained central to his artistic and scholarly activities.

=== University of California, Los Angeles ===
In 1994, Margulis accepted an appointment as professor of piano at the UCLA Herb Alpert School of Music. He continued to perform internationally and to give masterclasses while teaching students at the university.

His teaching was associated with detailed score analysis, independent interpretation and the development of individual artistic expression. According to UCLA, students trained by Margulis received more than 100 prizes at international piano competitions.

On 16 April 1998, a concert celebrating Margulis's 70th birthday was held at UCLA's Schoenberg Hall. Pianist Martha Argerich, who had developed a friendship with Margulis during his years in Freiburg, performed with his children, cellist Natalia Margulis and pianist Jura Margulis. The concert also featured performances by five of Margulis's UCLA students. Reviewing the event for the Los Angeles Times, music critic Mark Swed discussed both Argerich's participation and the individuality displayed by Margulis's students.

Margulis remained active as a performer and teacher into the final years of his life. His later concerts included performances of Beethoven's late piano works and demanding repertoire by Sergei Rachmaninoff. According to Volchek, his concert activity continued until 2009.

== Russian School and Freiburg PianoFest ==
In 1977, Margulis and Freiburg music patron Elisabeth Geissler-Ruckmich (1901–1998), associated with the city's Musikhaus Ruckmich, established the Russische Schule (Russian School), an international summer masterclass for advanced pianists in Freiburg im Breisgau. It became a recurring educational and cultural event in the city, combining piano instruction with public performances.

The school's existence is documented in contemporary publications. The Swiss VMS-Bulletin advertised a masterclass under Margulis's direction, explicitly identified as Russische Schule, for 20 August to 1 September 1979. The published registration information named Musikhaus Ruckmich in Freiburg.

The masterclasses were subsequently held at the Historisches Kaufhaus, a historic building on Münsterplatz opposite Freiburg Minster. The courses typically lasted approximately two weeks and attracted young pianists from a variety of countries. Teaching sessions were open to the public, allowing audiences to observe advanced piano instruction and interpretation.

By 2004, the Russische Schule had reached its 28th edition. The course, held from 19 to 31 July, was directed by Vitaly Margulis and his son Jura Margulis. The programme concluded with a public concert by participating students, during which the audience selected the recipient of the Ingrid-Martin-Förderpreis.

=== PianoFest concert series ===
Alongside the educational programme, Margulis developed the PianoFest Russische Schule, a series of public concerts held during the summer masterclasses. The concerts were presented in the Kaisersaal of the Historisches Kaufhaus and brought together established international pianists, former students and emerging performers.

The 2004 festival opened with a recital by Margulis featuring Beethoven and Claude Debussy. Other performers included Polina Leschenko with violinist Michael Bezverhny, Igor Kamenz, Grigory Gruzman, Sergey Babayan and Bernd Glemser. The programme encompassed works by Mozart, Beethoven, Chopin, Brahms, Liszt, Schumann and contemporary composers.

The 2006 edition, held from 17 to 30 July, included Bella Davidovich, Dmitri Bashkirov, Bernd Glemser and Igor Kamenz alongside Margulis. The festival formed part of Freiburg's broader Münstersommer cultural programme.

In July 2007, the PianoFest Russische Schule continued at the Historisches Kaufhaus, with performers including Margulis, Igor Kamenz and Elisabeth Leonskaja. The concerts were again incorporated into the city's summer cultural programme.

=== Continuation as the Internationale Klavier Akademie Freiburg ===
Margulis directed the original Russian School from 1977 to 2007. Its educational and concert traditions were subsequently continued by the Internationale Klavier Akademie Freiburg, directed by his son Jura Margulis. The successor programme retained the combination of intensive piano teaching and public concerts at the Historisches Kaufhaus.

The 2008 festival, advertised as PianoFest der Internationalen Klavier Akademie Freiburg, took place from 14 to 26 July and presented pianists including Lilya Zilberstein, Malcolm Bilson, Vitaly Margulis and Jura Margulis.

According to the City of Freiburg, more than 1,000 students from around the world attended the original Russian School. The municipality identifies the Internationale Klavier Akademie Freiburg and its PianoFest concerts as successors to Margulis's masterclass tradition. Later festival publicity has also identified Martha Argerich among the pianists associated with the PianoFest concert series, although the specific date of her appearance is not established by the surviving publicity.

== Teaching and pupils ==
Margulis's pedagogical career spanned more than five decades. He taught at the Leningrad Conservatory from 1958 to 1974, at the Hochschule für Musik Freiburg from 1975 to 1994, and subsequently at UCLA. He also conducted international masterclasses in Germany, Switzerland, France, Greece, Belgium, the Netherlands, Portugal, Italy, Spain, Japan, Russia, Australia and the United States.

His teaching emphasized the relationship between musical structure and interpretation. Rather than advocating uniform performances, he encouraged students to develop individual artistic approaches grounded in the study of original scores, articulation, phrasing and tempo relationships.

Among the pianists who studied with him were Bernd Glemser, Grigory Gruzman and Igor Kamenz. Glemser studied under Margulis in Freiburg before pursuing an international concert career and becoming a professor of piano. Gruzman also studied with Margulis in Freiburg and later taught at the Franz Liszt University of Music Weimar.

Margulis was particularly interested in transmitting musical knowledge between generations. His son Jura studied with him at the Hochschule für Musik Freiburg and subsequently continued the family's pedagogical tradition through his own academic appointments and the direction of the Internationale Klavier Akademie Freiburg.

In addition to the Freiburg summer courses, Margulis conducted masterclasses at international conservatories and festivals. In 1992, he organized an unusual two-week masterclass aboard the hydrographic vessel Sibiryakov in the Baltic Sea, bringing together students from several countries.

He also returned to Saint Petersburg to conduct masterclasses at his former conservatory and participated in the International Conservatory Week festival during the 2000s.

== Musical interpretation and research ==
Margulis published musicological studies and writings on performance practice. His principal research interests included the keyboard music of Bach, the piano works of Beethoven and the relationship between musical structure, tempo and expressive interpretation.

=== Bach and musical symbolism ===
One of Margulis's principal research interests was the religious and symbolic interpretation of Bach's keyboard compositions. In his 1981 study J. S. Bachs symbolische Sprache und das Wohltemperierte Klavier, he investigated symbolic relationships in The Well-Tempered Clavier and their possible implications for musical performance.

He also wrote about performance indications in Bach's keyboard music. His approach reflected his broader conviction that technical execution should arise from an understanding of a composition's structural and expressive content.

=== Beethoven and tempo relationships ===
Margulis developed an approach to tempo interpretation that he called the Formula of Tempo Relationships (German: Formel der Tempoverwandtschaft). His 1983 publication Tempoverwandtschaft in der Musik examined proportional relationships between tempos within musical compositions, particularly Beethoven's works.

The approach proposed that tempo decisions within a composition could be understood in relation to an underlying musical structure rather than treated as wholly independent interpretative choices. Margulis subsequently explored these ideas in his writings on Beethoven's piano sonatas.

His research included analytical studies of Beethoven's Piano Sonata No. 32 in C minor, Op. 111, particularly the final movement, Arietta. His interpretation combined questions of tempo, musical architecture and philosophical meaning.

=== Writings on piano pedagogy ===
Margulis also published reflections on piano teaching and musical interpretation in a series of collections entitled Bagatellen. These writings combined aphorisms, observations and practical advice concerning musical education, artistic responsibility and the relationship between teachers and students.

The Bagatellen appeared in several editions and translations, including German, English, Japanese, Italian and Portuguese versions. Margulis's writing was intended not only for professional musicians but also for readers interested in broader philosophical questions surrounding musical performance.

In 2006, he published Paralipomenon: Novellettes from the Life of a Musician, a collection of literary and autobiographical reflections. His works were also presented at the International Conservatory Week festival in Saint Petersburg.

== Selected publications ==
- J. S. Bachs symbolische Sprache und das Wohltemperierte Klavier. Freiburg, 1981.
- Tempoverwandtschaft in der Musik: Beethovens Prinzipien der Metronomisierung; neue Möglichkeiten, das Metronom einzusetzen. Isny: Wittner, 1983.
- Об интерпретации фортепианных произведений Бетховена [On the Interpretation of Beethoven's Piano Works]. Moscow: Muzyka, 1991.
- Багатели, или Мысли и афоризмы пианиста [Bagatelles, or Thoughts and Aphorisms of a Pianist]. Saint Petersburg: Biblioteka Zvezdy, 1992.
- Bagatellen op. 5: Aphorismen und Gedanken eines Pianisten. Freiburg: Rombach, 1999. ISBN 3-7930-0888-6.
- Bagatellen op. 9: Aphorismen und Gedanken eines Pianisten. Freiburg: Rombach, 2003. ISBN 3-7930-9365-4.
- Багатели опус 10 [Bagatelles, Opus 10]. Moscow: Klassika-XXI, 2003.
- Паралипоменон: Новеллетты из жизни музыканта [Paralipomenon: Novellettes from the Life of a Musician]. Moscow: Klassika-XXI, 2006.
- М. Мусоргский. Картинки с выставки [M. Mussorgsky: Pictures at an Exhibition]. Saint Petersburg: Kompozitor, 2007.

The bibliography is documented in Volchek's survey of Margulis's published works and in library and publisher records.

== Selected recordings ==
Margulis's discography includes recordings of Bach, Beethoven, Chopin, Schumann, Scriabin, Tchaikovsky, Rachmaninoff and Prokofiev. Selected releases include:

- Russian Piano Music by Tchaikovsky, Scriabin, Rachmaninoff and Prokofiev — Christophorus, 1977.
- J. S. Bach: Passionsmusik aus dem Wohltemperierten Klavier — Christophorus, 1980.
- Scriabin: Poèmes — Aurophon, 1986.
- Beethoven: Piano Sonata No. 32, Op. 111 — Aurophon, 1986.
- Chopin: Nocturnes — 1988.
- Chopin: Piano Sonata No. 2, Études and Polonaise — 1990.
- Schumann: Kreisleriana; Chopin: Polonaise-Fantaisie and Waltzes — DSB, 1993.
- Chopin: Études, Op. 10 — 2009.

His recordings were subsequently reissued in a variety of formats, including CD and digital releases.

== Personal life and legacy ==
Margulis had four children, three of whom pursued professional musical careers. They include pianist Jura Margulis, violinist Alissa Margulis and cellist Natalia Margulis. The three musicians have performed together in chamber music ensembles, including the Margulis Family Trio.

His artistic and pedagogical influence continued through his students, publications and the Freiburg piano masterclass tradition. The Internationale Klavier Akademie Freiburg, under Jura Margulis's direction, maintained the combination of public masterclasses and concert performances developed by the Russian School.

Margulis died at his home in Los Angeles on 29 May 2011, aged 83. UCLA published a memorial acknowledging his contributions as a performer, teacher and writer.

On 15 April 2012, a memorial concert was organized at UCLA's Schoenberg Hall, featuring colleagues and members of his family. Performers included pianist Kanae Matsumoto, violinist Daniel Shindarov, baritone Vladimir Chernov and Margulis's children Jura, Alissa and Natalia. The concert commemorated his teaching career and his influence on several generations of musicians.
