= Cobblestone mosaics (Freiburg im Breisgau) =

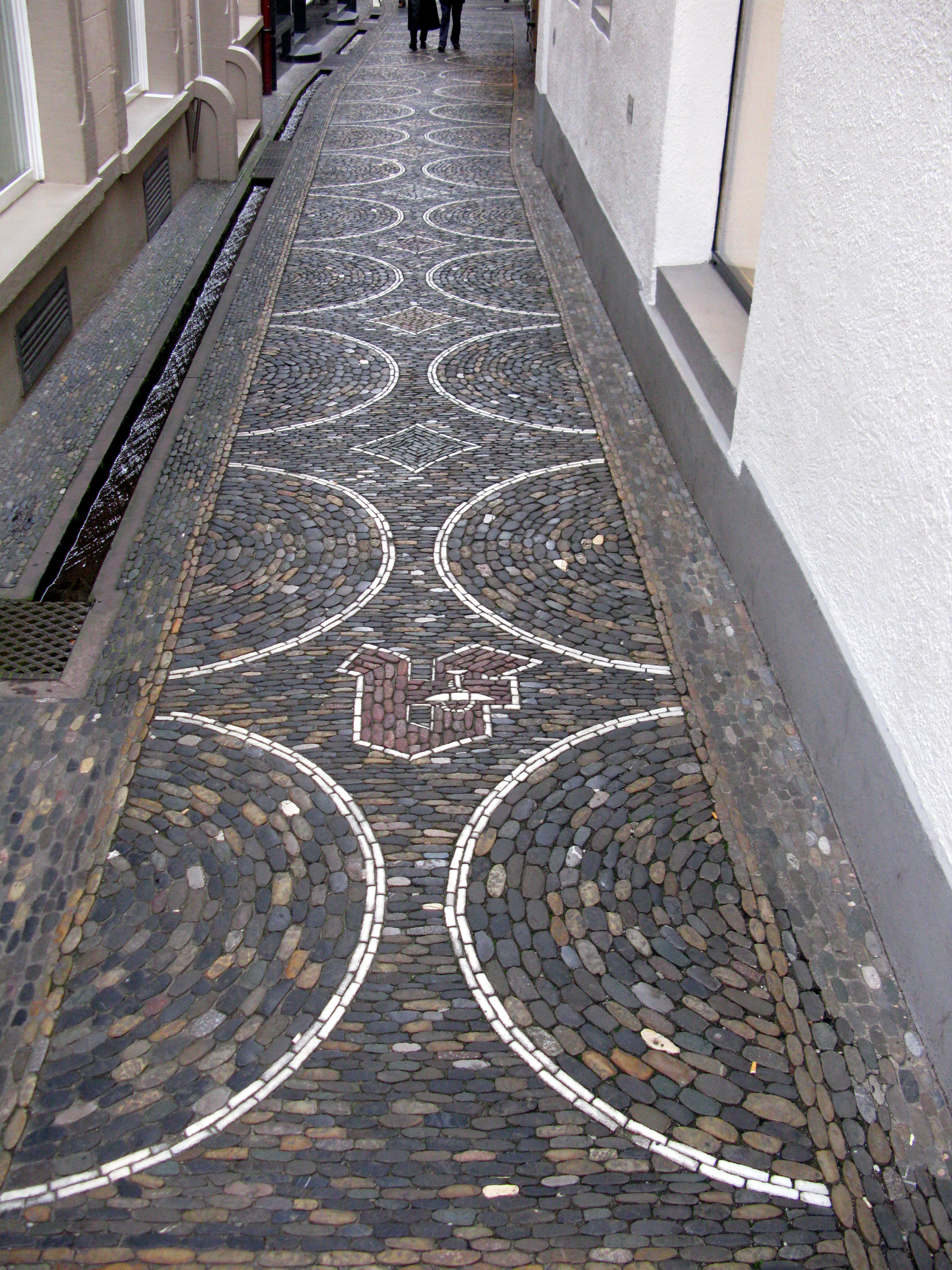
Augustinergasse, Freiburg im Breisgau

Cobblestone mosaics can be found throughout Freiburg im Breisgau. Most mosaics are embedded in the cobblestone pavement of the city centre of Freiburg.

== History ==
These mosaics are commonly attributed to the paver Alois Krems, who lived in Freiburg in 1858. His work was inspired by pavings he had seen during his time as a wandering journeyman in southern France. In the late 19th century, major road reconstruction works took place in Freiburg, during which the Bächle were relocated from the centers to the edges of the roads. As a result, several roads in different parts of town (Wiehre, Herden, Neuburg) were repaved with cobblestone between 1901 and 1911. The new basalt pavements are streaked with veins of white marble. Furthermore, they feature the year in which they were constructed. Even though the bombing of Freiburg on 27 November 1944 destroyed about 38km of roads and pavements, many of the pavings survived and can still be admired today.

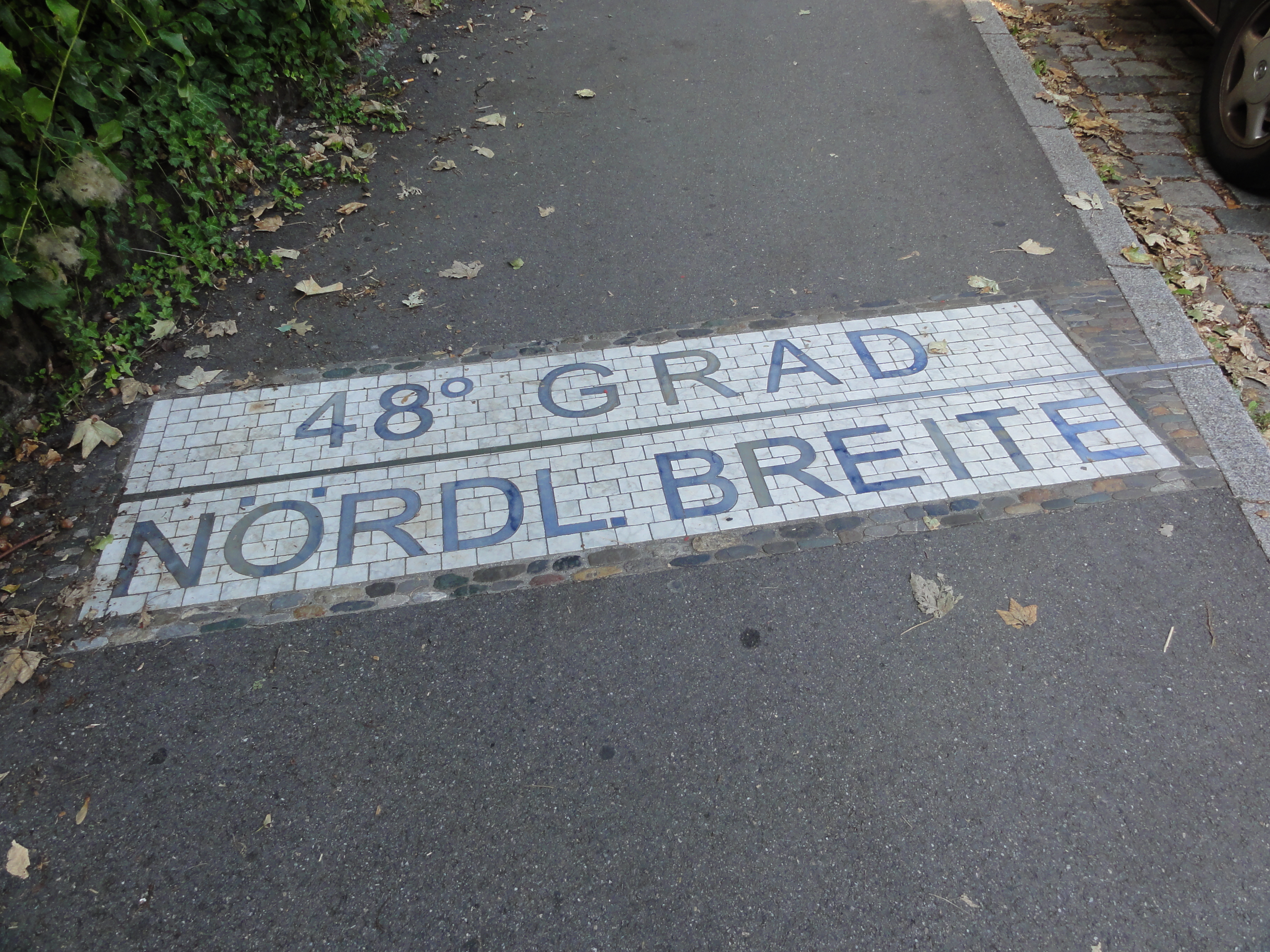
48th parallel north, Habsburgerstraße, Freiburg im Breisgau

The tradition of cobblestones enjoyed a revival during the 1970s when the old city of Freiburg was turned into a pedestrian zone. For instance, the pavements of Kaiser-Joseph-Straße, Freiburg's main shopping street, was paved with red porphyry and decorated with bands of white marble and smaller cobbles found in the Rhine. Larger cobblestones from the Rhine were also used to pave the Minster square. In 2012 a path leading to the main entrance of the minster was evened out so that the handicapped can access the church more easily.

At the beginning of the Habsburgerstraße a mosaic on the pavement marks the course of the 48th parallel north.

== Origins of the Stones ==
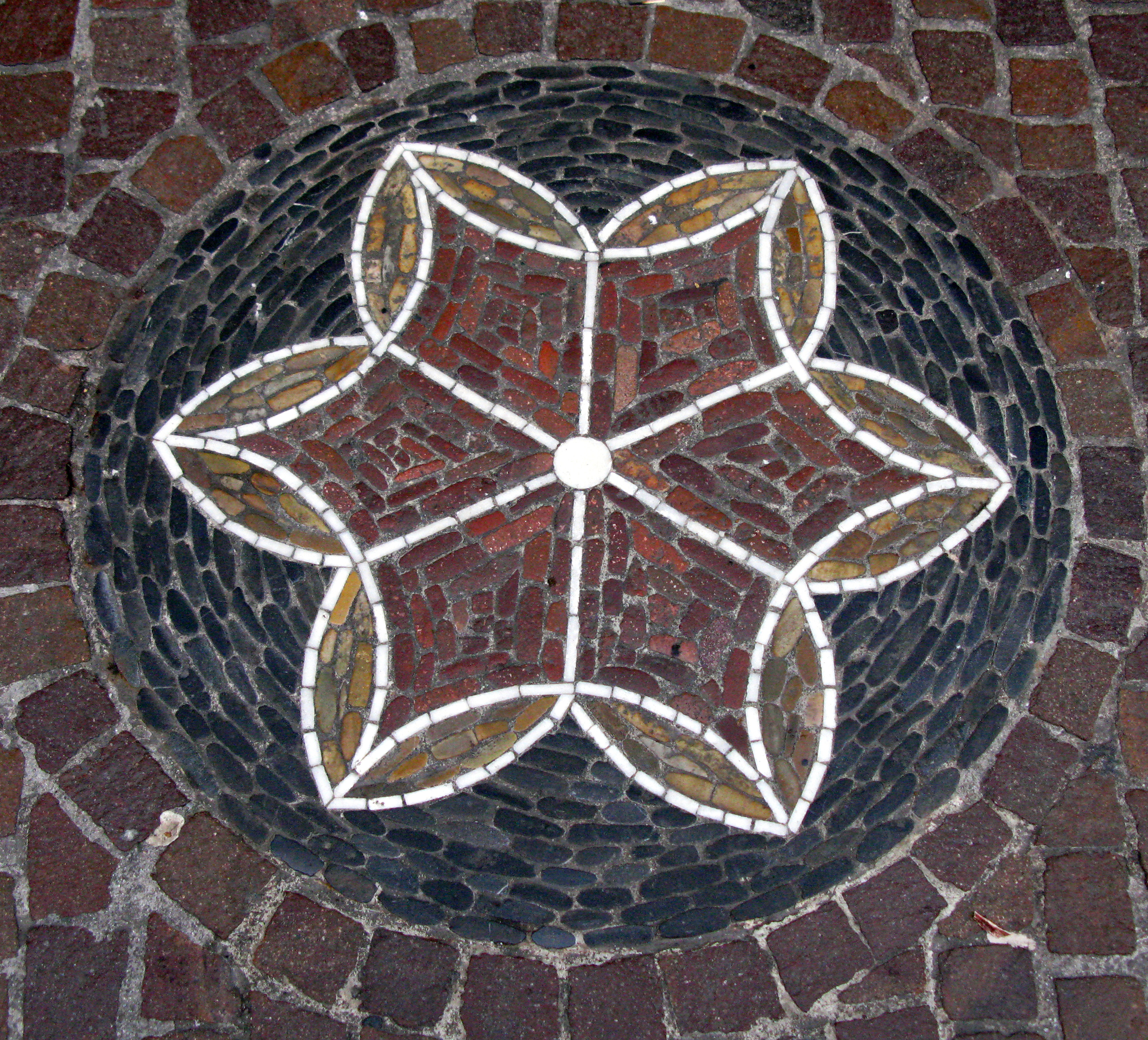
Bertoldstraße, Freiburg im Breisgau

The round mosaics, decorative bands and at times even the paving of whole alleys consist mostly of coloured cobblestones from the Rhine. In the past, the stones used to be extracted from the Rhine flood plains close to Breisach in periods of low flow. However, this has become more difficult nowadays since the stock has depleted. Occasionally, new cobbles are obtained from gravel pits in the Rhine basin. Furthermore, stones that were replaced by asphalt are stored and reused. Other stones like porphyry, granite, basalt and marble have been purchased in Europe in the past and are obtained from all over the world today for economic reasons. Sporadically, artificial stones are used for details.

== Processing ==
To attain flat ellipsoidal cobbles, the paving stones are either cut by machine and have their edges smoothed in a drum mixer, or they are manually broken down and trimmed underneath to improve their stability. They are cut to be 6 to 12 cm long and 2 to 3 cm wide. The depth of each stone needs to be at least 2/3 of its length. The finished cobbles are set in the ground with their flat side facing up to create a smooth surface. Bigger stones are processed by machines. Usually, the cobbles are set in a sand subfloor. Occasionally, as is the case in Kaiser-Joseph-Straße a mortar subfloor is used. The cobbles are pressed into the subfloor using a paving hammer.

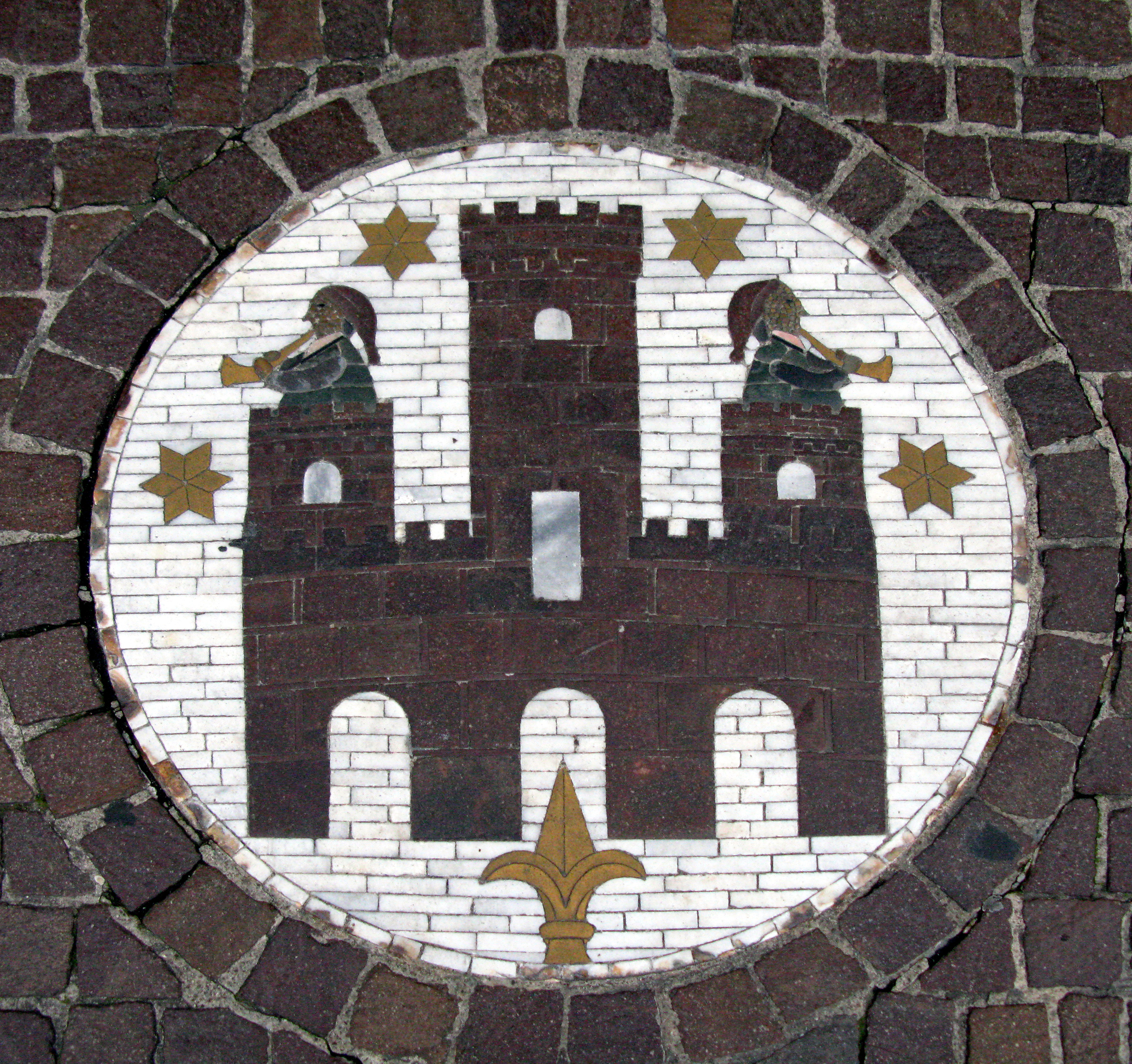
Wasserschlössle, Symbol of Freiburg

In the city centre of Freiburg, round mosaics in the paving can be found almost everywhere. These mosaics often show symbols of trade or historical references to the building that lies behind it. Some of these mosaics have mere ornamental character, others display emblems, coats of arms or short brand names.

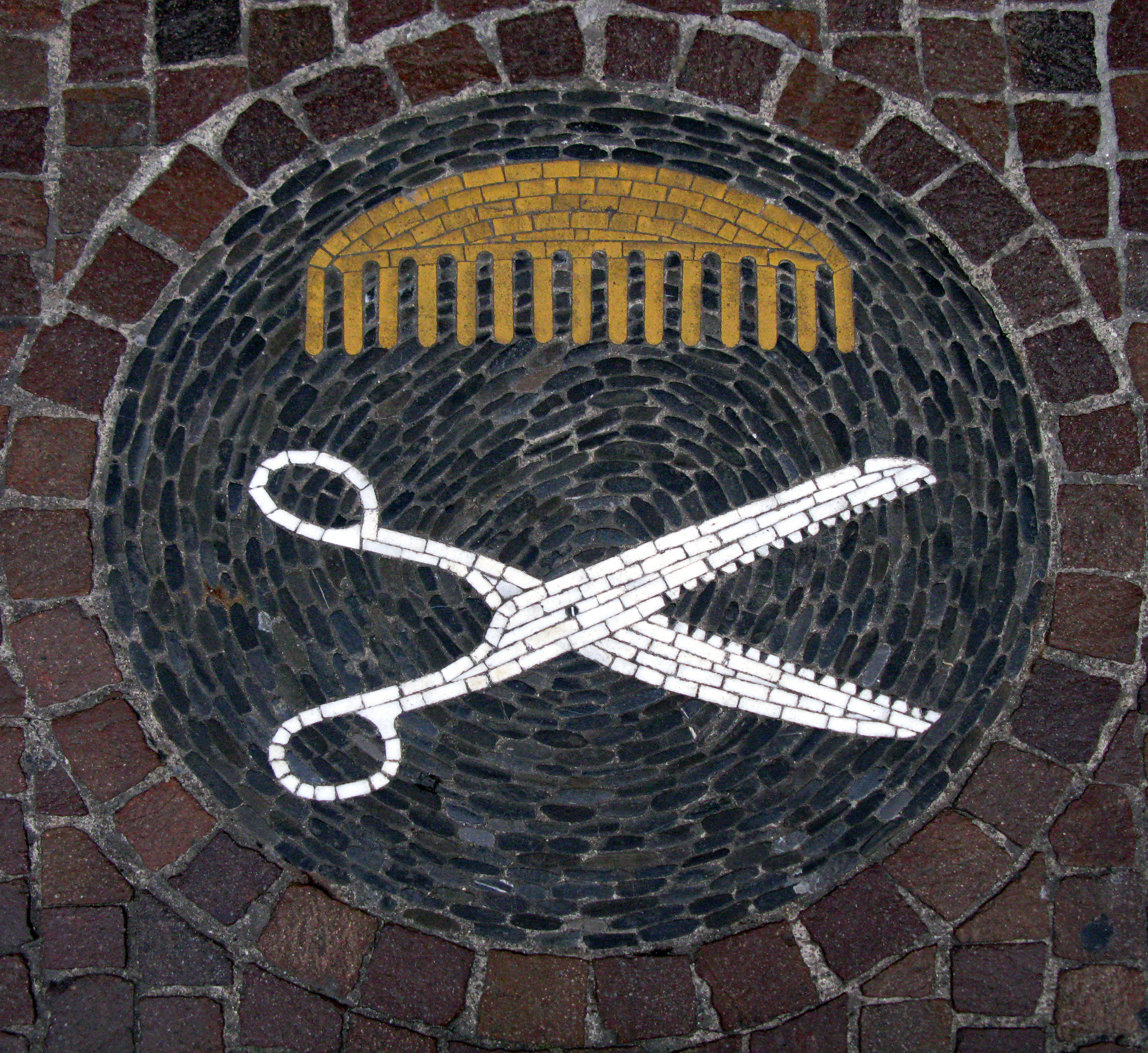
Hair Salon, Bertoldstraße, Freiburg

If these round mosaics take great effort to piece together they are assembled with the help of a wooden stencil in a steel ladle filled with mortar. This technique has been used in Freiburg since the 1970s. This way the mosaics can be prepared at a builder's yard and do not have to be destroyed for road work. Each of these portable mosaics weighs ca. 400 kg. Freiburg's twin cities each were given such a mosaic showing Freiburg's coat of arms. Commissioned mosaics for cities in the vicinity are also produced in Freiburg.

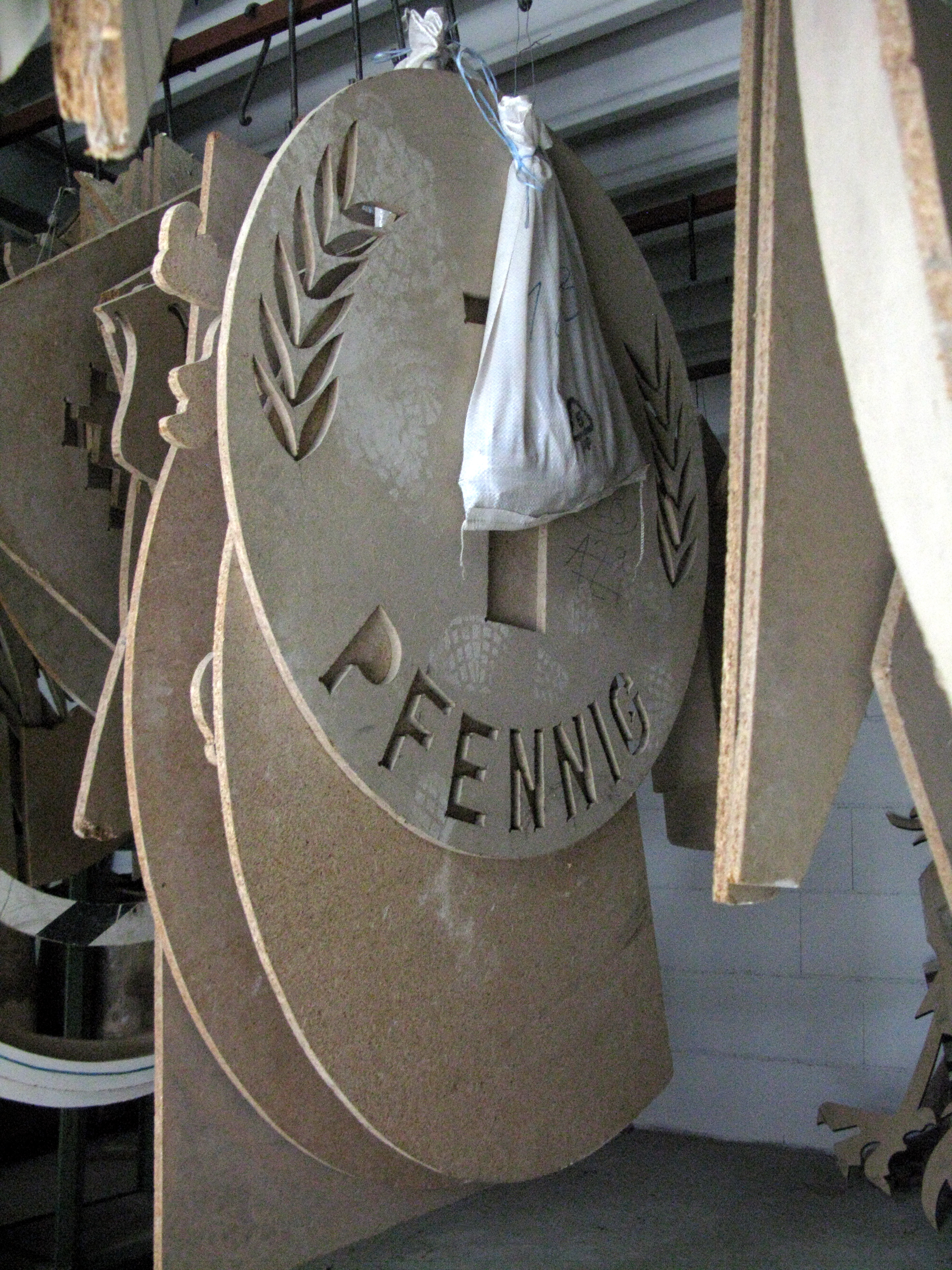
Wooden Stencils

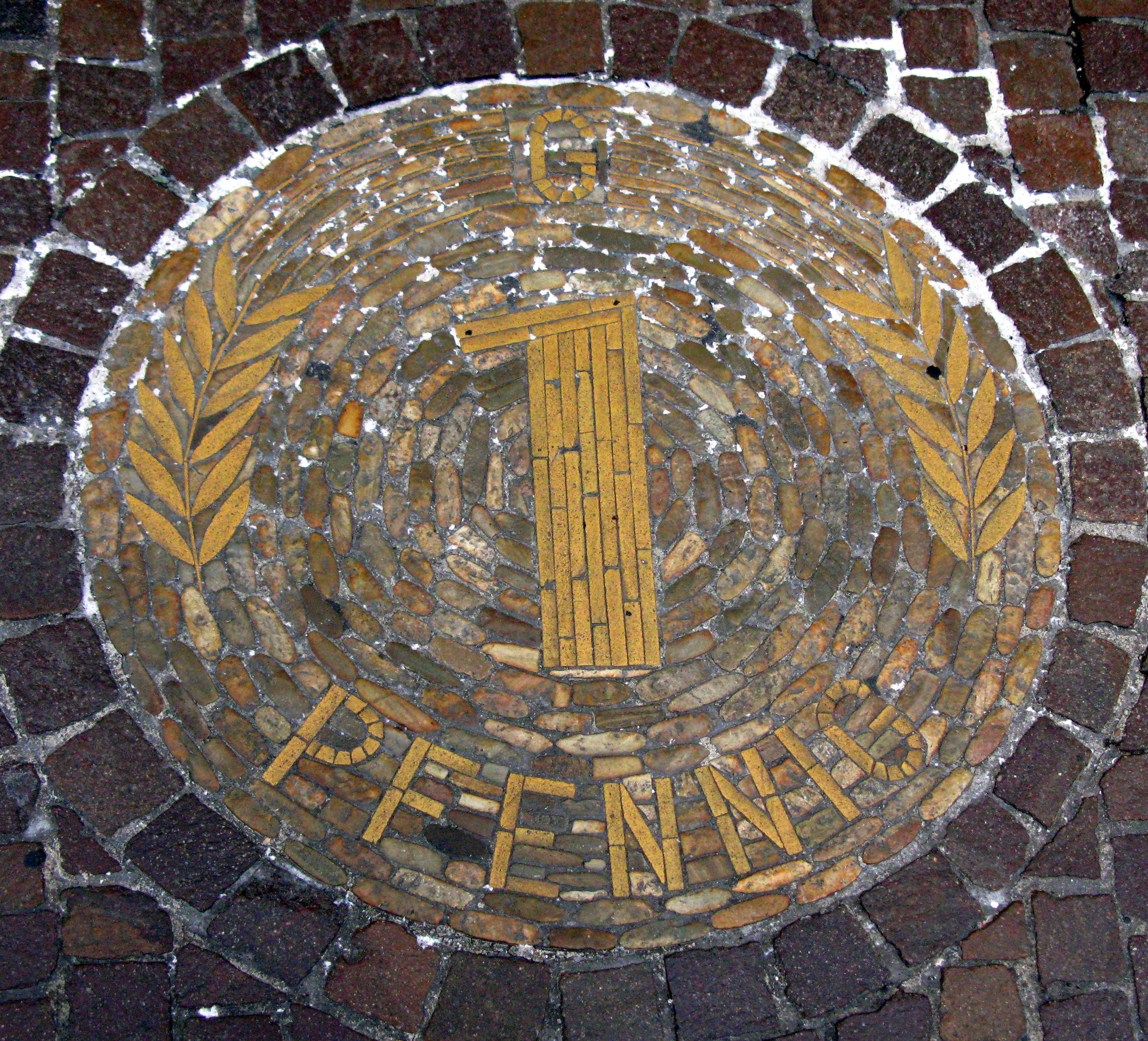
Bertoldstraße, Freiburg im Breisgau

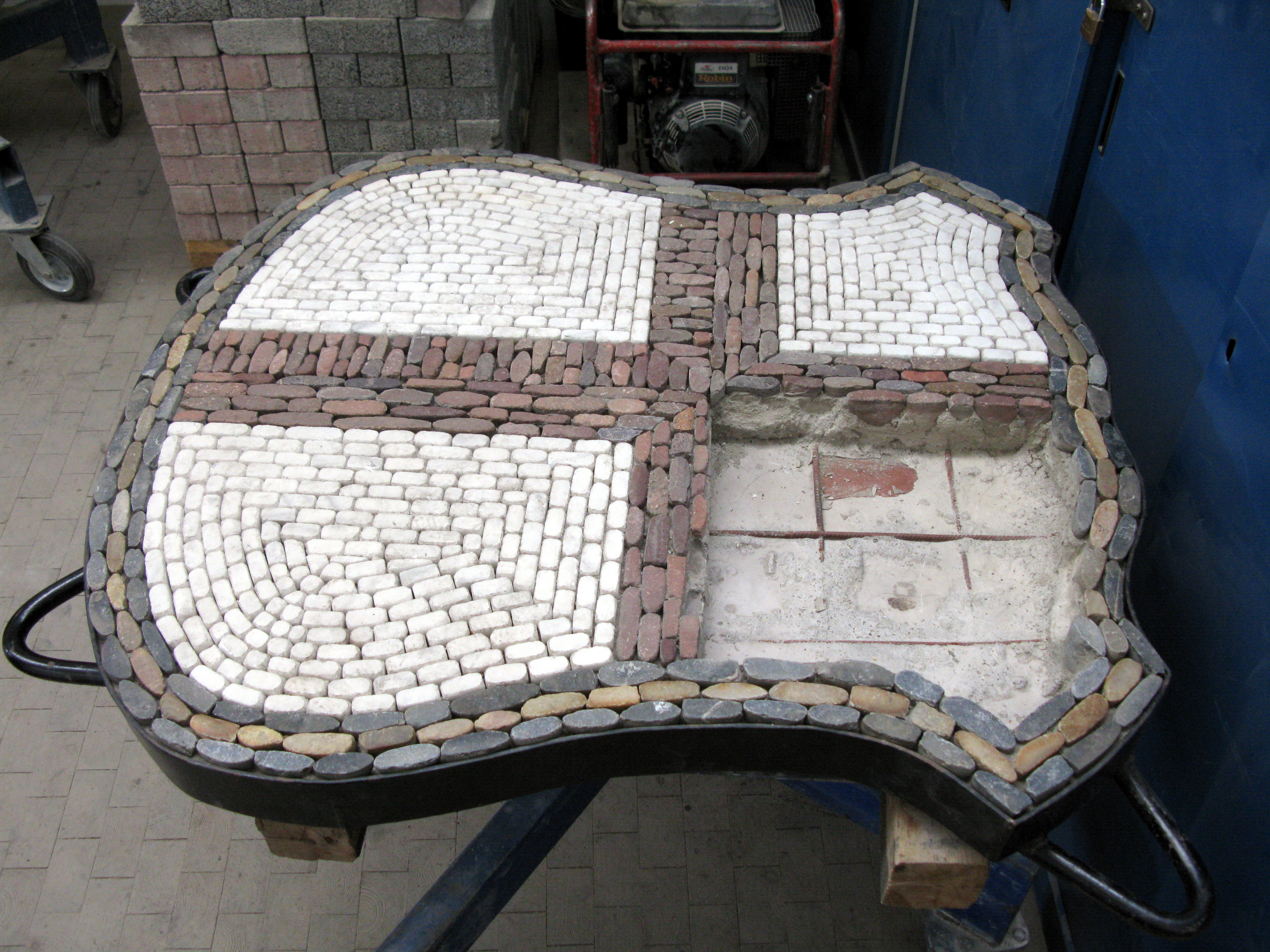
Freiburg's coat of arms in a steel ladle (unfinished)

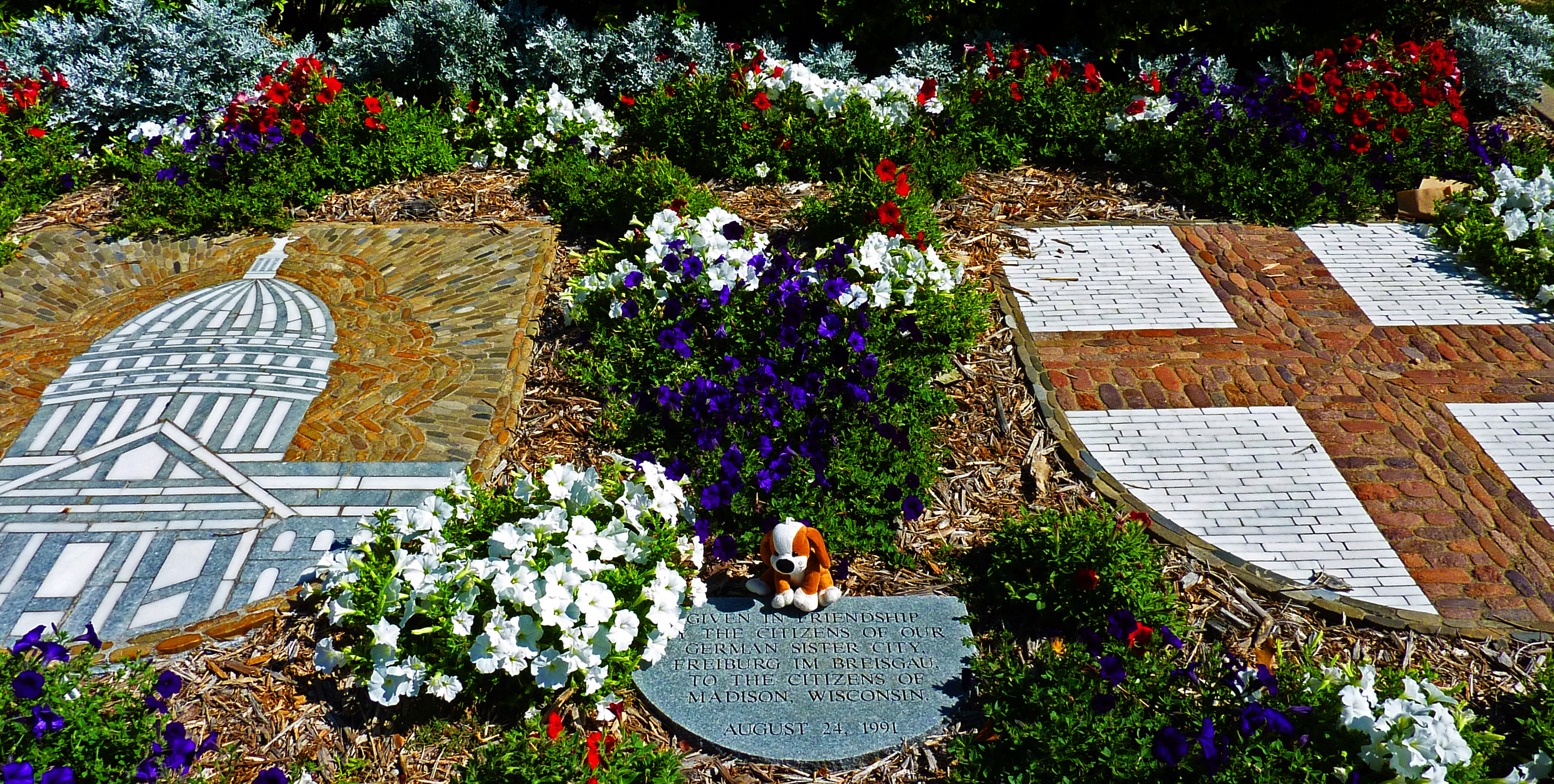
Gifts to Freiburg's sister city: Mosaics in Madison, WI

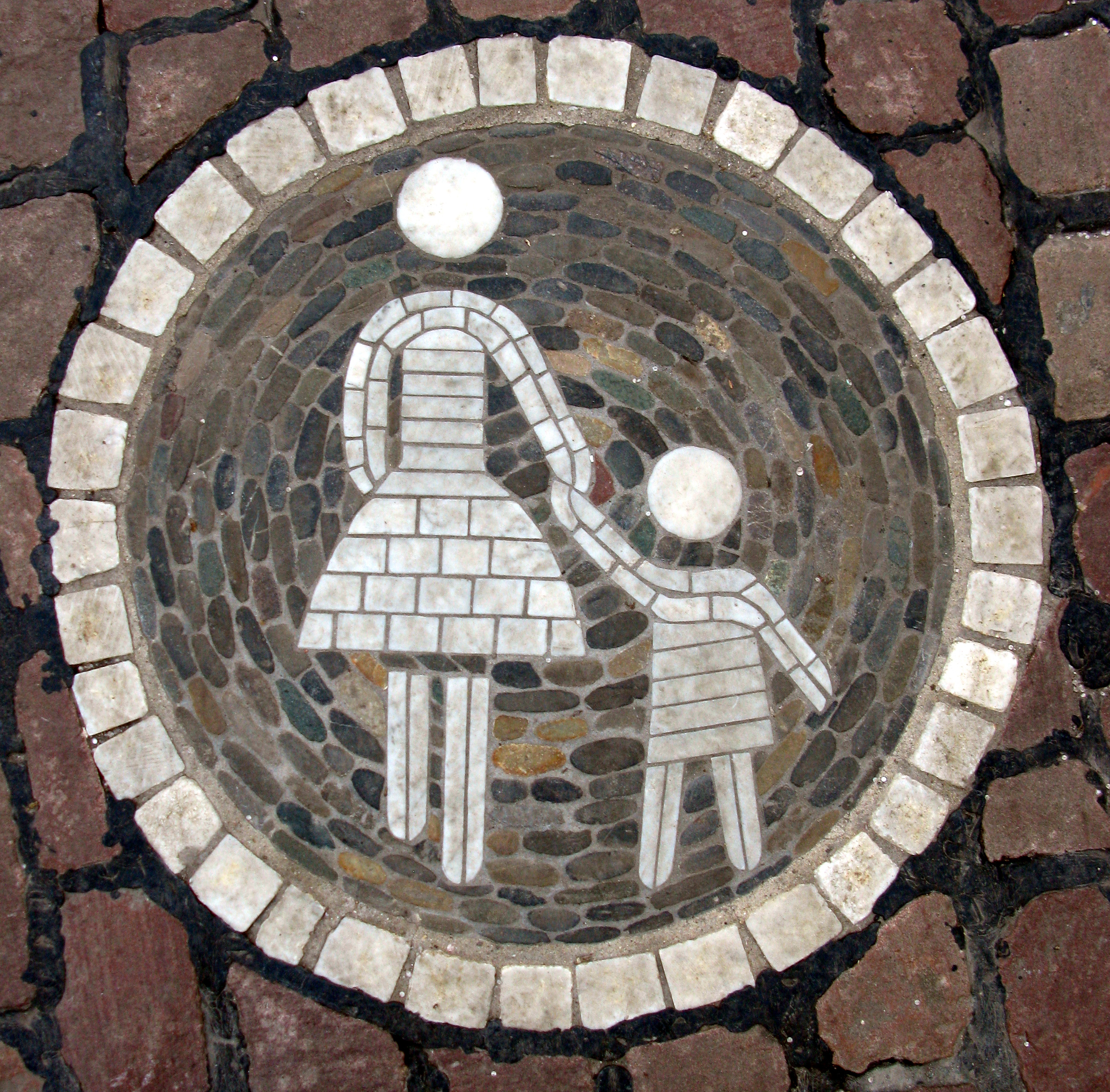
Traffic sign

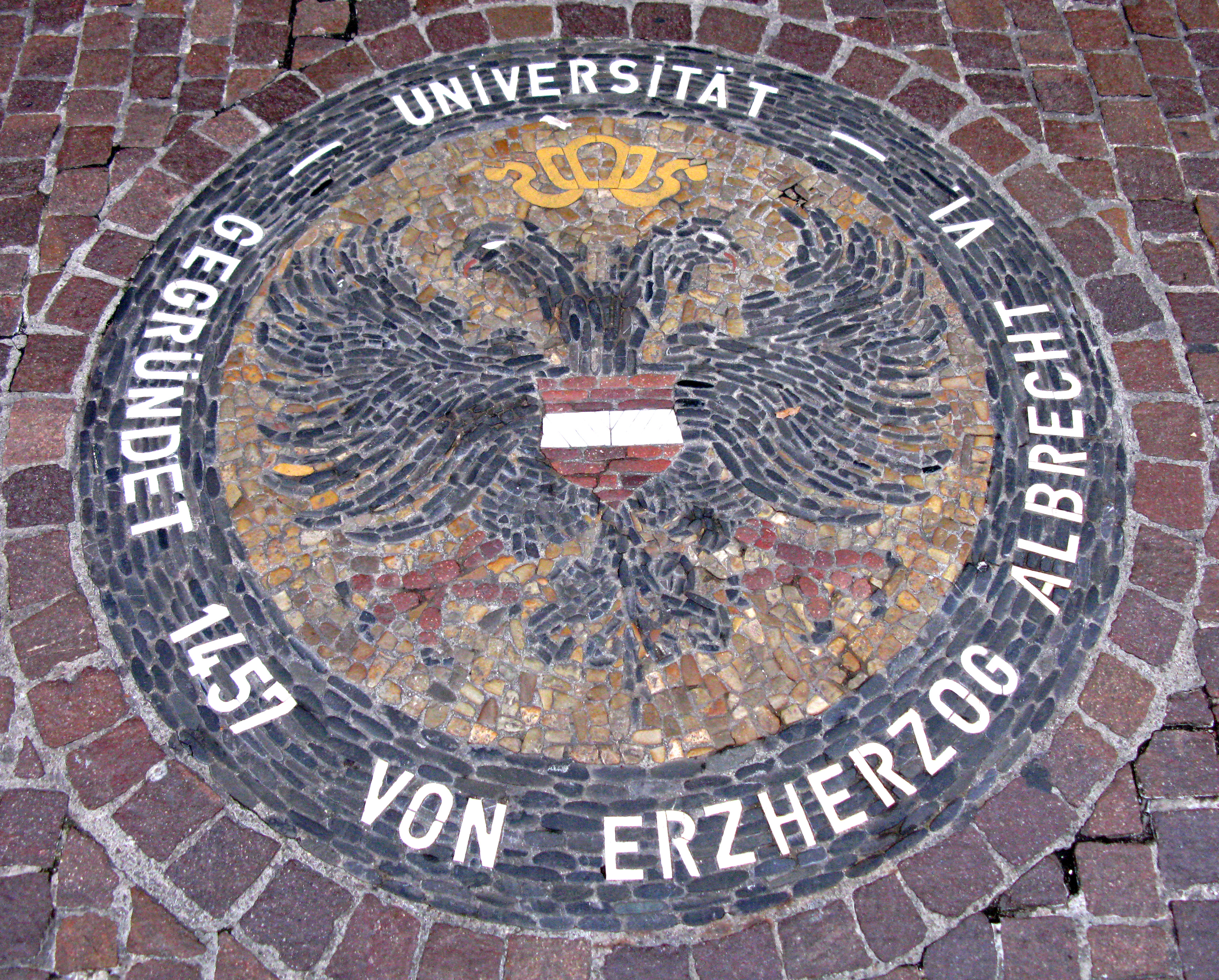
University of Freiburg

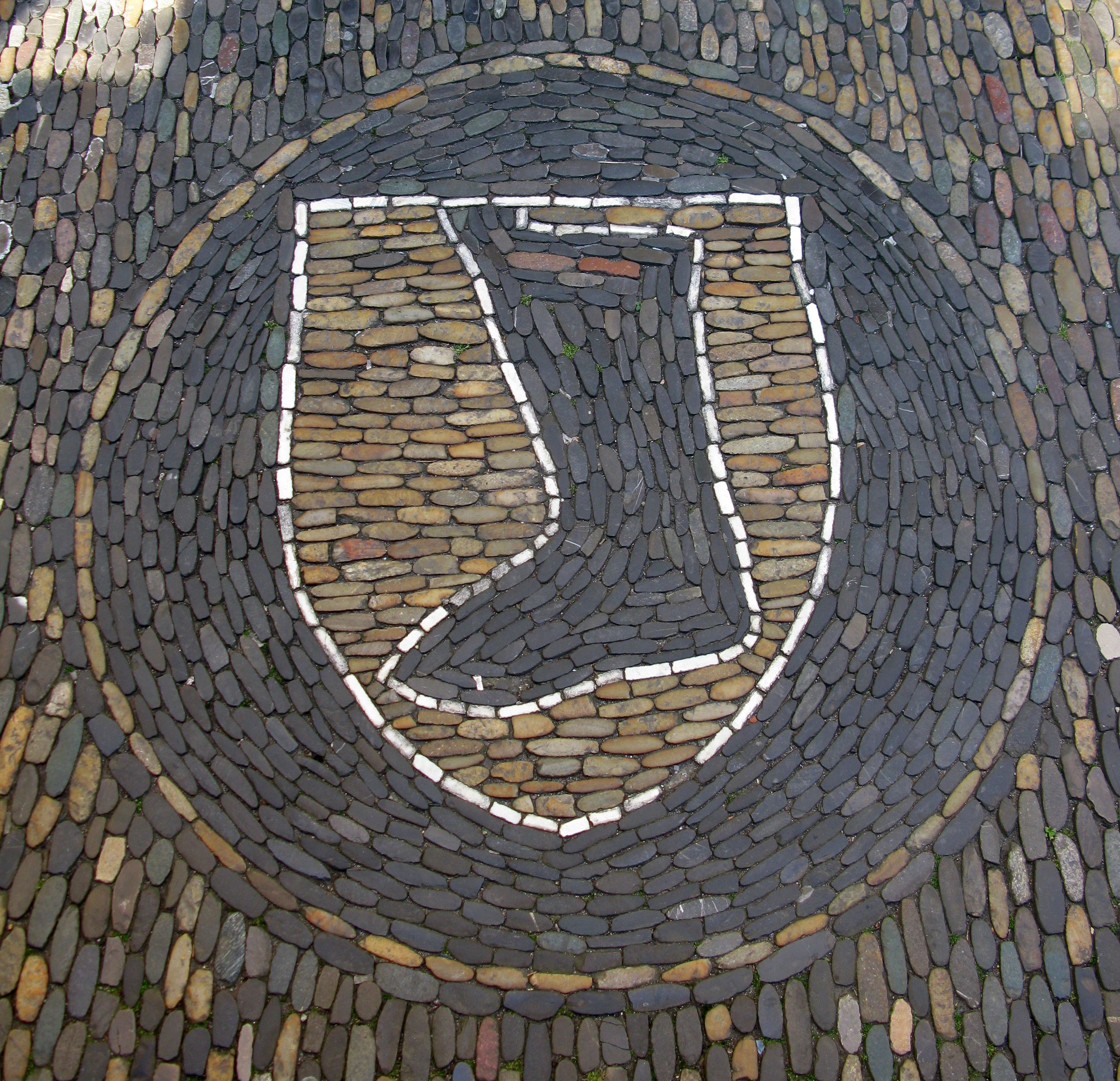
Shoe shop, Freiburg im Breisgau

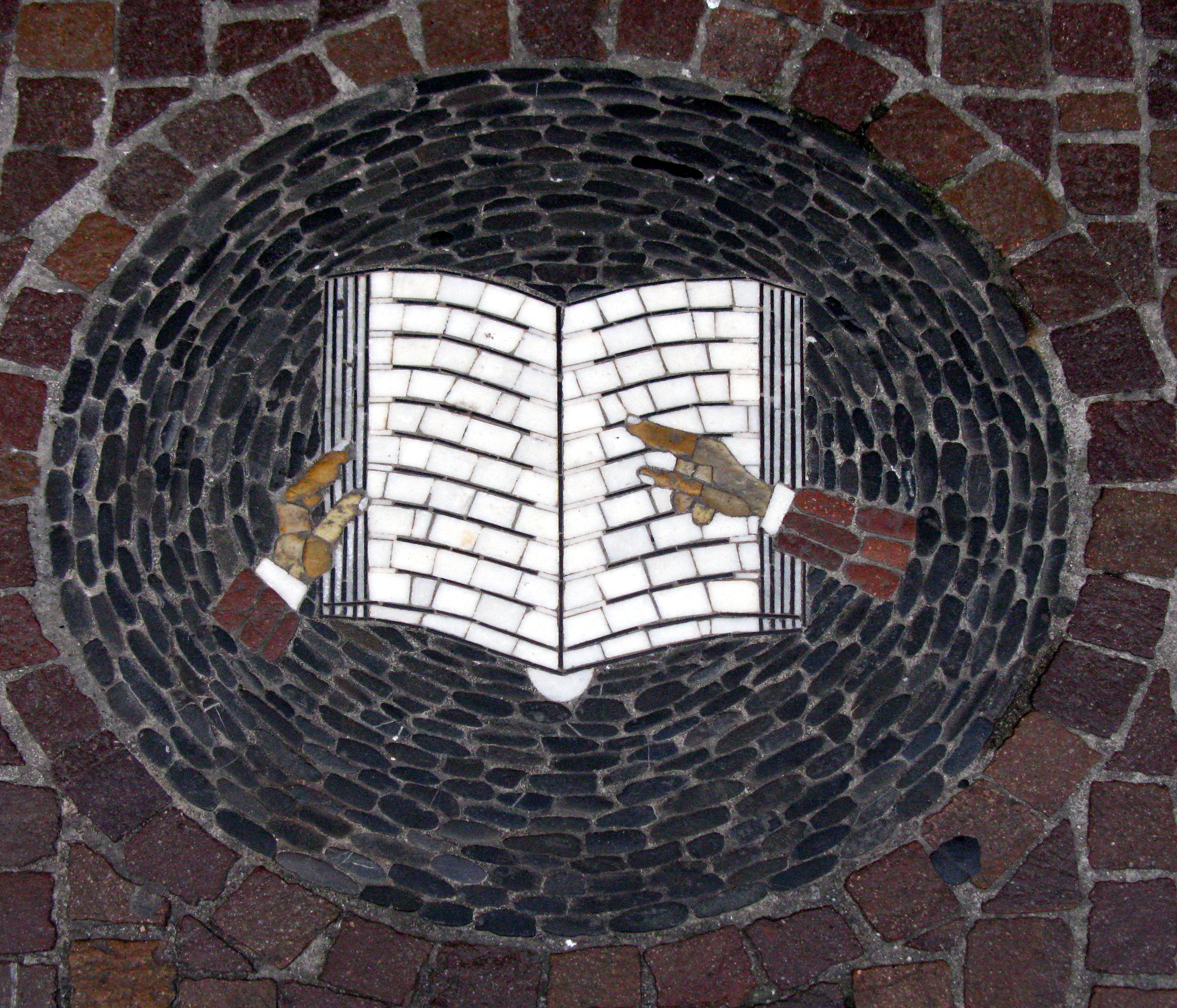
Book shop, Freiburg im Breisgau

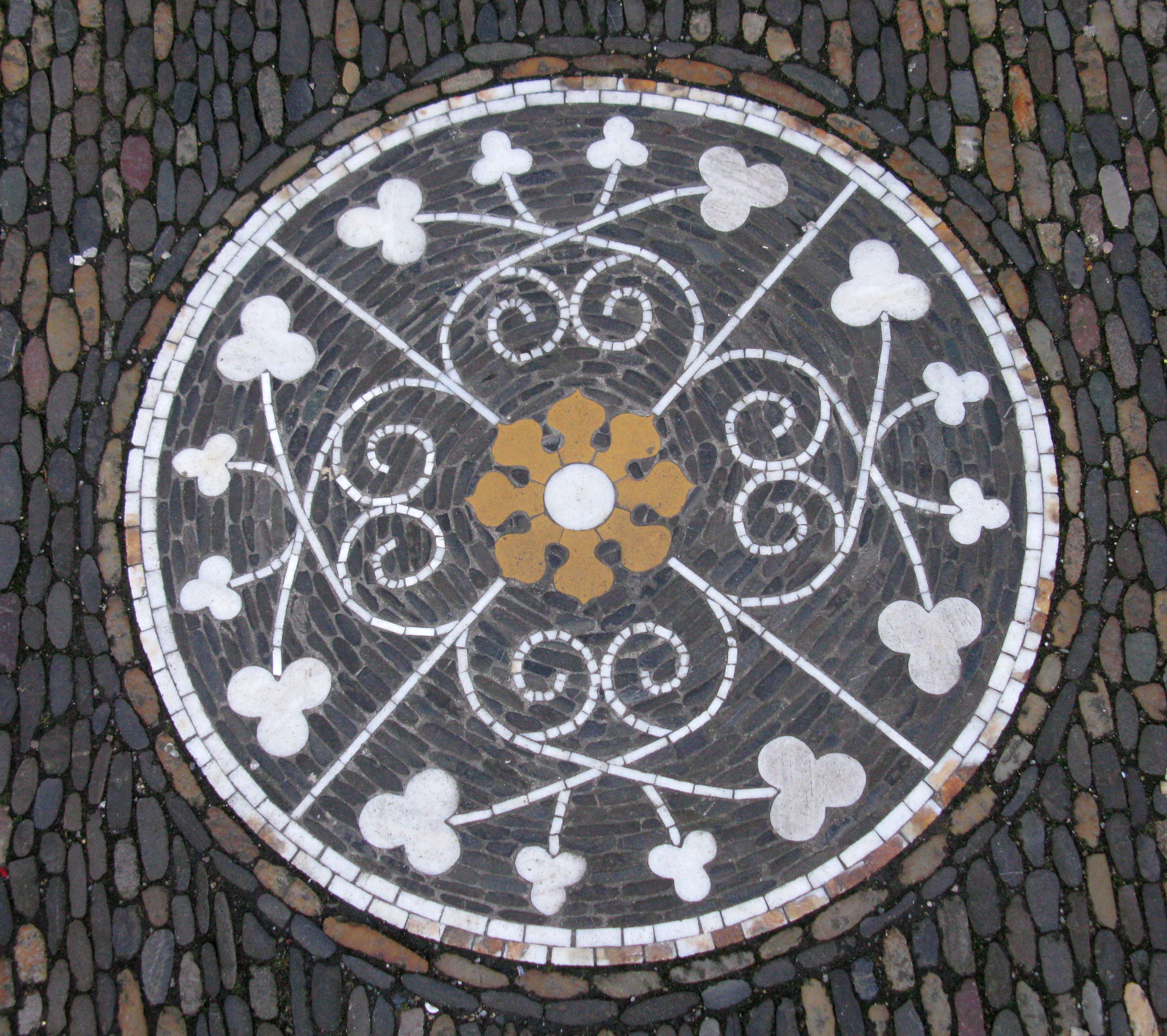
Ornaments, Freiburg im Breisgau

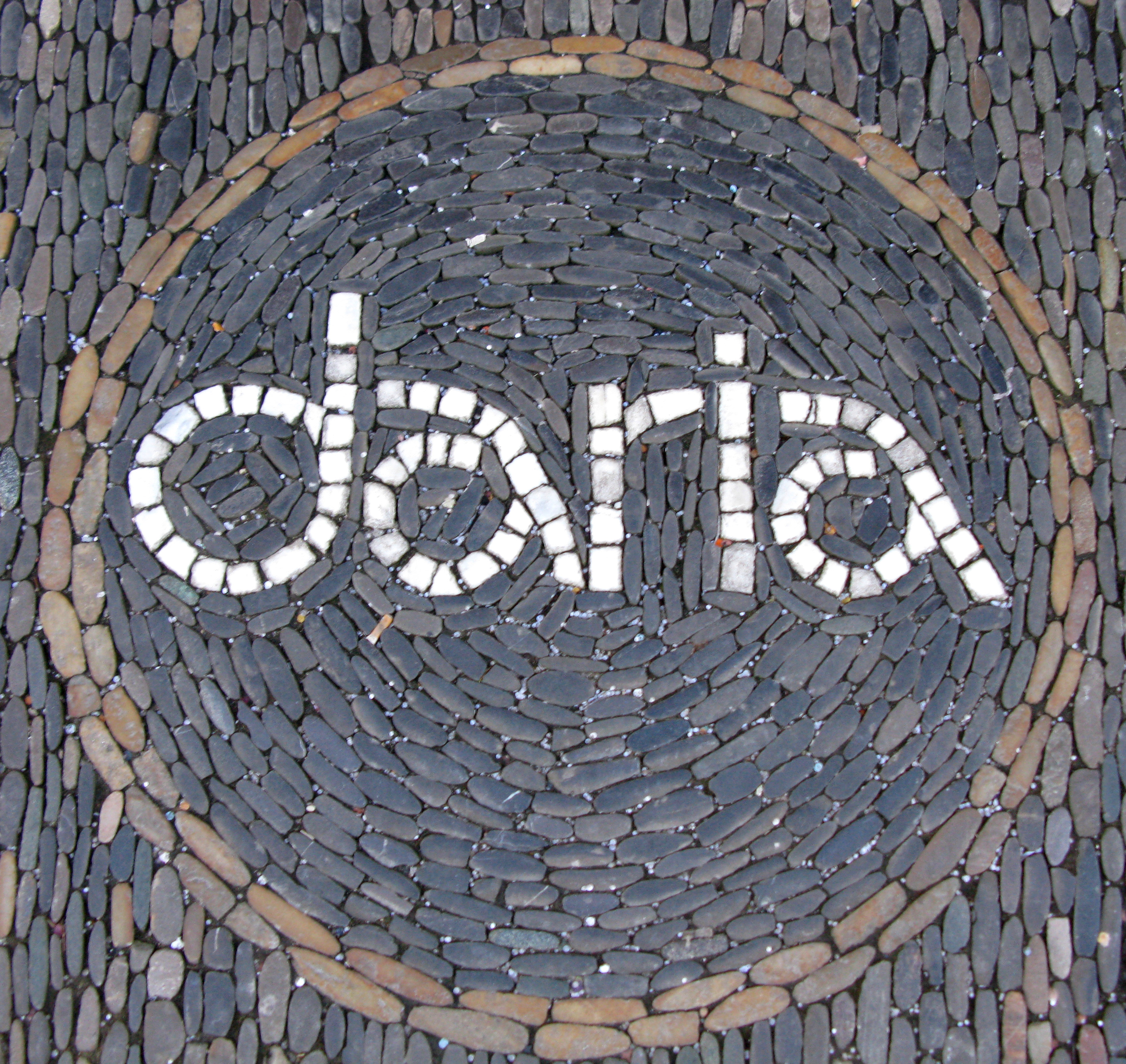
Brand name, Herrenstraße, Freiburg im Breisgau

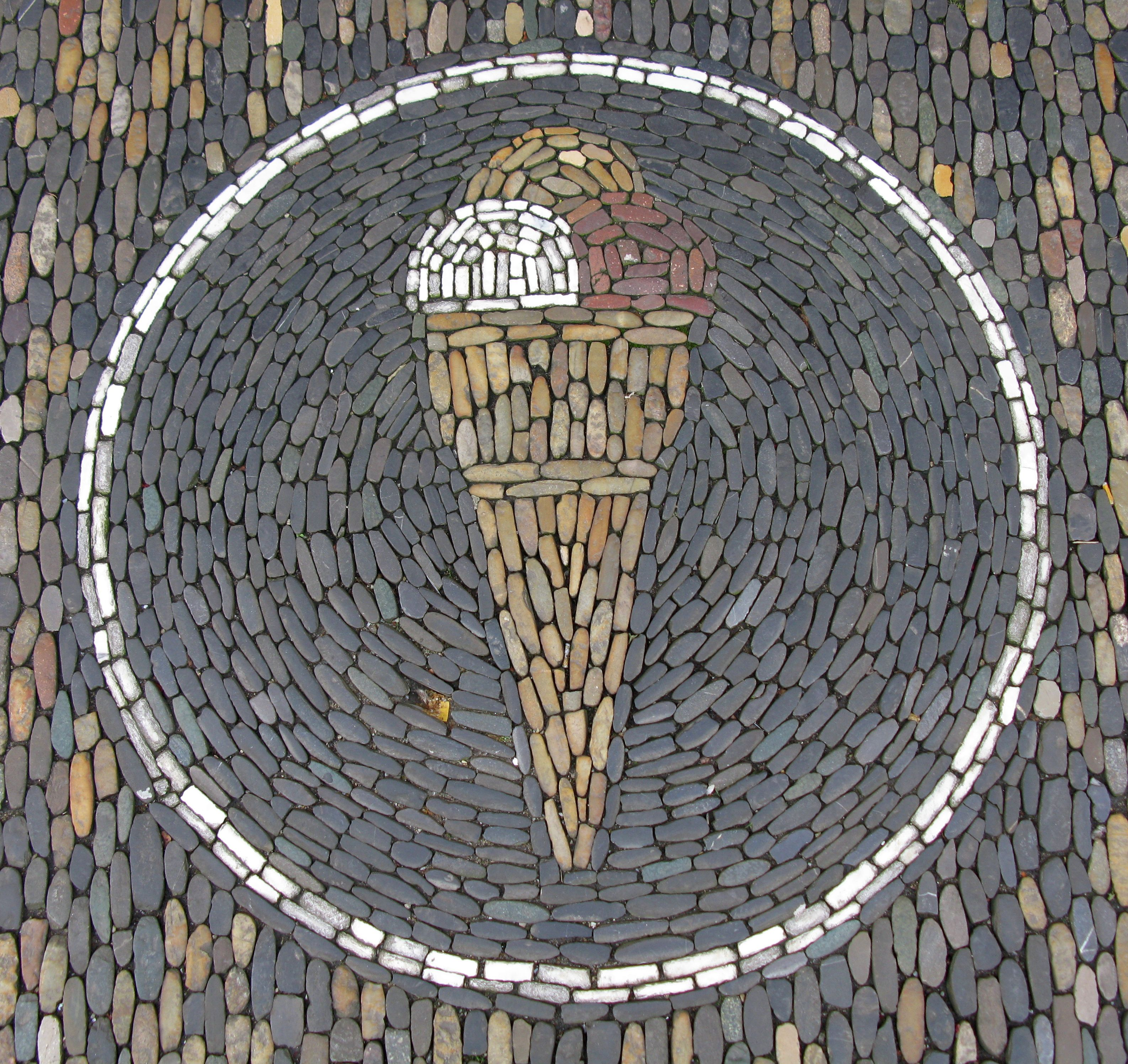
Ice cream parlour, Freiburg im Breisgau

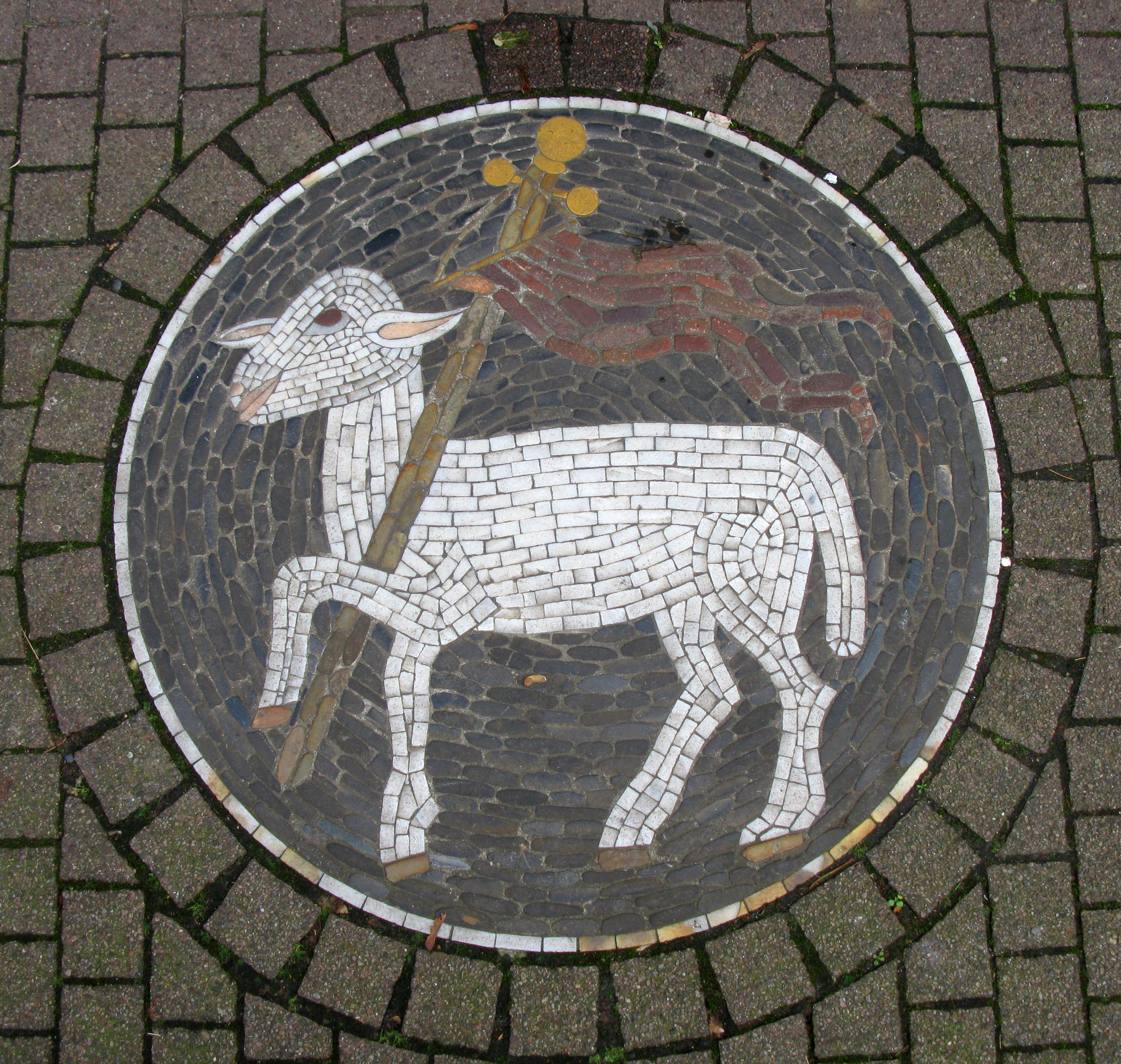
Butcher's, Freiburg im Breisgau
