= Minster Square (Freiburg im Breisgau) =

Square in Freiburg im Breisgau, Germany

Coordinates: 47.9956°N 7.8524°E

The Minster Square in the centre district of Freiburg, Germany, is a paved area surrounding the Freiburger Minster. The city library, the Historical Merchants' Hall, the Wentzinger House and the Korn House are on this square. The Freiburger streams run along the sides of the square.

Nearly all of the surrounding buildings were destroyed in the bombing of Freiburg on November 27, 1944. Only the buildings on the southeast side of the square, the historic mall, the Wentzinger House and the Old Guard, as well as the Minster itself, were spared from destruction.

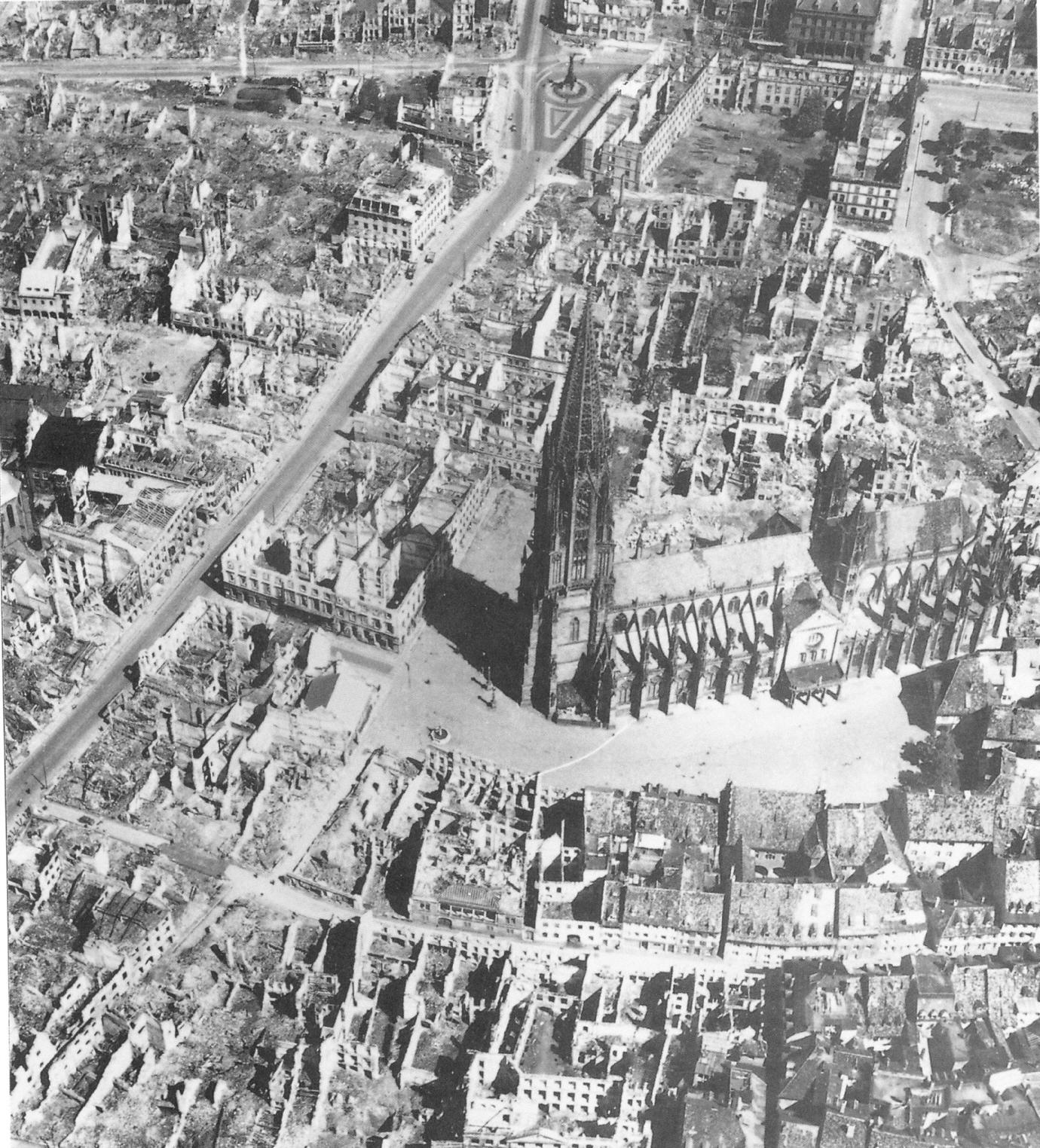
Aerial view of Freiburg, 1944

The Minster churchyard was originally surrounded by an approximately 1.60-metre-high (5.2 ft) wall, which was only taken down in 1785. It served mainly as a city cemetery on the north side in the Middle Ages. Here, the outlines of the former cemetery chapel of St. Andreas are embedded into the cobblestones. The chapel, which included an ossuary in the basement, was pulled down in 1752. In the year 1514, at the instance of Emperor Maximilian I, the cemetery was relocated to the suburban town of Neuburg because for sanitary reasons. Ever since then, the square has been used as a market place, which until then was on Kaiser-Joseph Street.

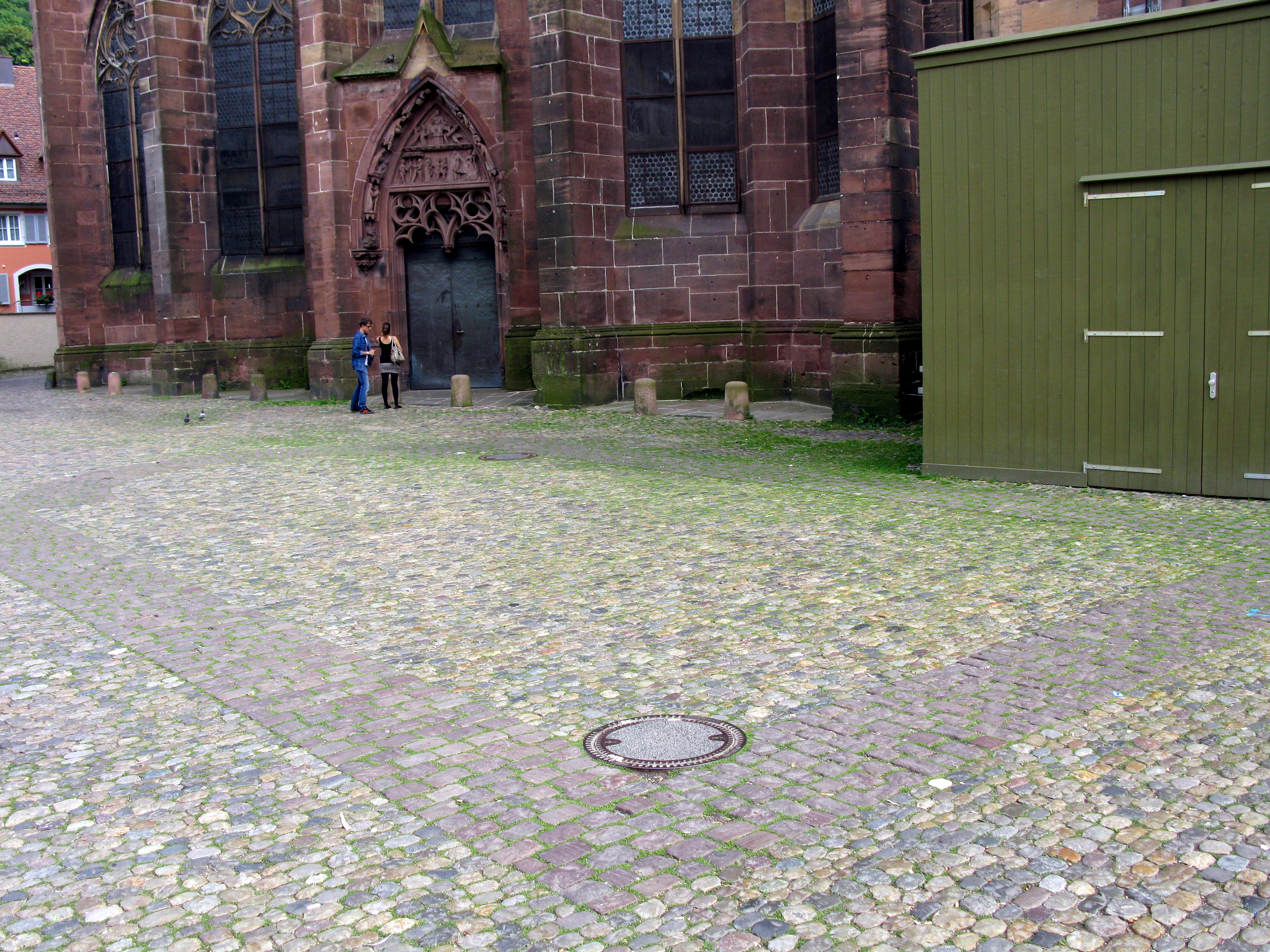
Outlines of the former cemetery chapel of St. Andreas

The market takes place on all working days - with one exception: on August 15, the day of the Assumption of Mary, who is the patron saint of the Minster, the square remains clear. On approximately 10,000 square metres, 80 to 180 market stalls offer groceries, craftwork and souvenirs. The northern side, the so-called farmer's market, is exclusively reserved for local farms and their products. On special occasions, for example the Freiburger wine festival, several stalls have to be shifted into the surrounding alleyways and partially also onto Kaiser-Joseph Street. For many visitors of the city, the minster market of Freiburg is an outstanding attraction. Until the pedestrian zone was established in the 1970s, the square was used as a car park in the afternoon.

In front of the main entrance there are three plague columns, which are located beneath the tower of the Minster. They were crowned by St. Mary as well as by the two patron Saints, Lambert of Lüttich and Alexander. St. Alexander is a catacomb saint who replaced St. George in portrayals as a patron saint in the 17th century. On the minster square, St. George can be found on the 'Georgsbrunnen', which is a fountain named after him. St. Lambert can be seen on in the 'Fischbrunnen'.
