= Volkswacht (Freiburg) =

Volkswacht (meaning People's Guard in English) was a social democratic newspaper which was published in Freiburg im Breisgau from 1911 until 1933. The newspaper masthead carried the slogan Tageszeitung für das werktätige Volk Oberbadens (Daily newspaper for the working people of Upper Baden).

== History and profile ==
When the Volkswacht appeared for the first time on 1 July 1911, the Catholic Church of Southern Baden reacted at once and the newspaper was denounced from church pulpits already on the following day, 2 July 1911, with a pastoral letter.

In 1920 the Volkswacht of Freiburg was the German newspaper which, in its editions of 22 and 23 March, covered the most extensively the legal proceeding before the court-martial in Freiburg against Unteroffizier Digele who had killed Gustav Landauer on 2 May 1919 in Munich.

On 17 March 1933, the Volkswacht was prohibited. The pretext for this action was that the social democratic member of the regional parliament Christian Nußbaum panicked because of previous threats when a group of policemen had invaded his apartment in Freiburg between 4 and 5 o'clock in the morning and broke the bedroom door open. He shot several times and two policemen were mortally wounded. Thereupon the publishing house of the Volkswacht in Freiburg was taken by assault by members of NSDAP, SA, SS and Der Stahlhelm who threw 16,000 hot off the press copies of the newspaper into the street and then went about setting them on fire. The publishing house was pillaged and devastated.
