= Historical Merchants' Hall (Freiburg) =

Coordinates: 47.994964°N 7.852727°E

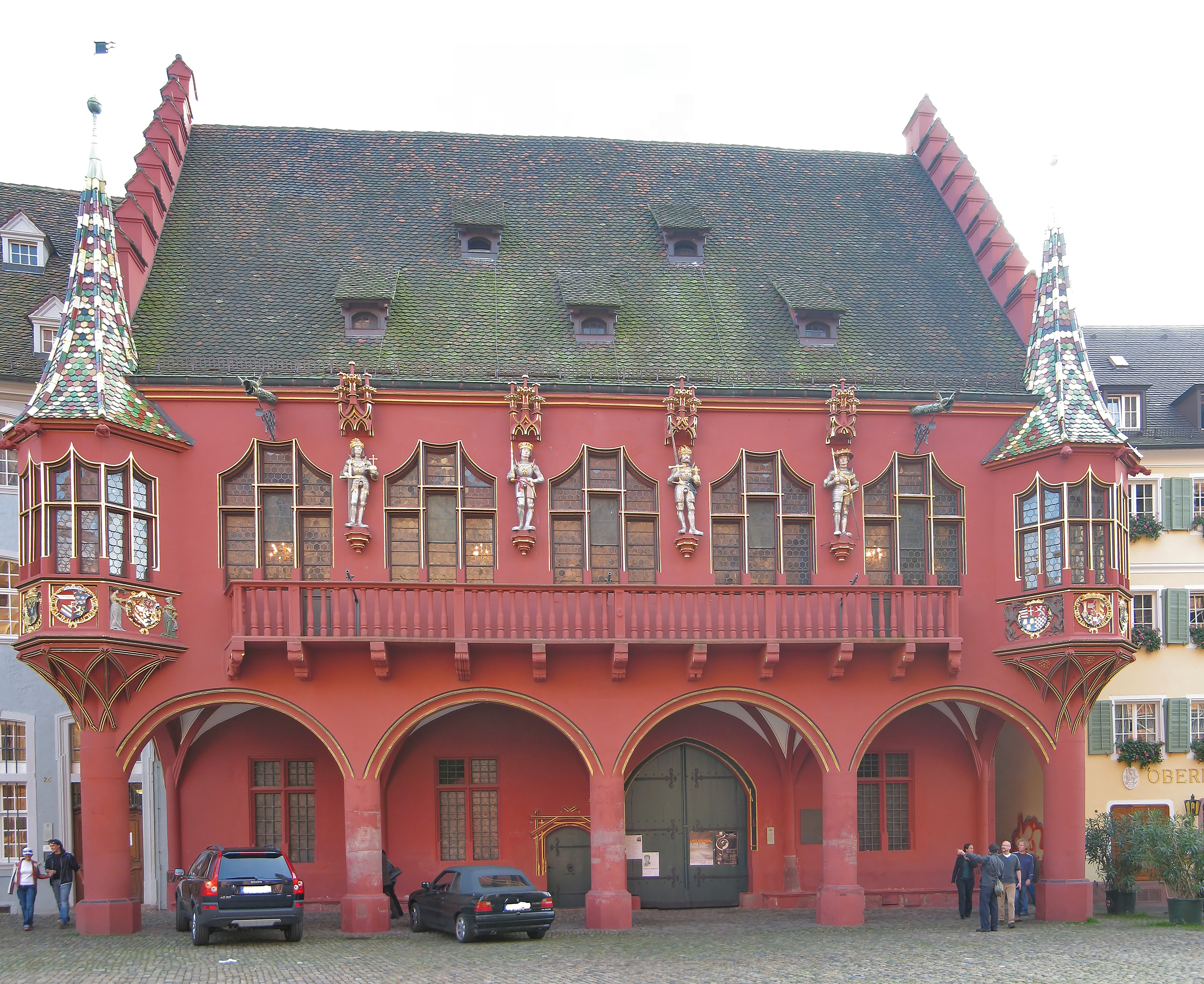
Front facing Minster Square

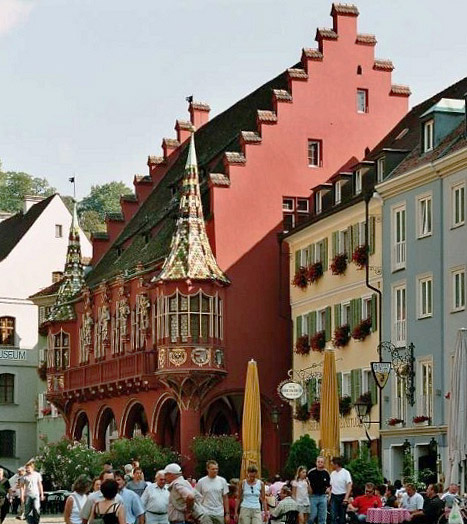
The side face of the merchants' hall

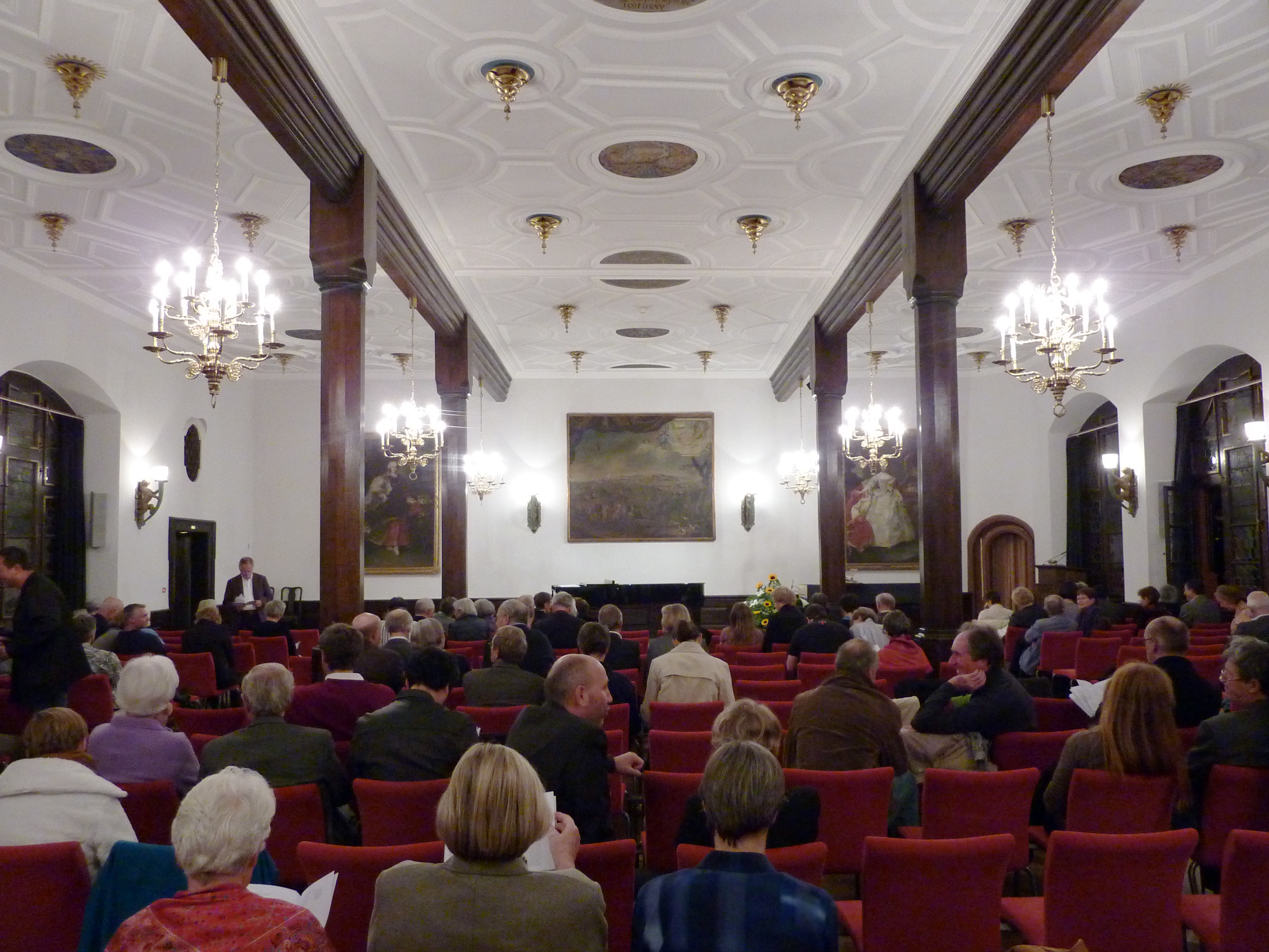
Emperors' Hall

The Historical Merchants' Hall (German: Historisches Kaufhaus) is one of the most outstanding buildings in Freiburg im Breisgau. It is situated on the south side of the Minster Square (market square around the Freiburg Minster). It stands out clearly due to its dominant red facade.

== History ==
The first municipal merchants' hall in Freiburg was built in the 14th century as a custom office. It was situated in the Schusterstraße and mentioned in 1378 for the first time in an official document. The building has retained in its present-day form since 1520. At that time the back of the original building was extended and became the new front facing the market square and Freiburg Minster. The building was completed in 1532. The architect of the building is not known, but it is assumed to be Lienhardt Müller (from Ettlingen).

In later years, the merchants' hall underwent multiple modifications. In 1550 a balcony was added, in 1744 the merchants hall needed to be rebuilt due to bomb damage, in 1814 the facade was changed, in 1884 the building was remodeled according to the prevailing taste of the time. In 1924 the changes of 1884 were undone. Its contemporary state dated back to the extensive renovations which it underwent in 1988.

From 1946 to 1947 the building served as the office of the Beratende Landesversammlung (precursor of the Baden Parliament with the task of drawing up the constitution of Baden). From 1947 to 1951 the historical merchants hall served as a legislative building for the South Baden state.

== Description ==
The striking building with its crimson paint and extensive decoration, is situated with its eaves to the Minster Square (Freiburg im Breisgau). The high housetop with two attic stories is lined by crow-stepped gables. From the outside the four arcades with an access balcony facing the Minster are an eye-catching feature of the building. At ground level one enters through a gate a hall, which opens onto an inner courtyard. This hall is only open to the public on special occasions. Situated above the hall is one room that takes up the entire upper floor. The room has so-called arched curtain windows in the late Gothic style with the windows opening onto the market place. Two delicate, polygonal bay windows with colored tiles flank the arched curtain windows on the outside of the building. The front of the building is decorated with sculptures and the crest of the House of Habsburg, which were carved by Hans Sixt von Staufen between 1520 and 1531. The sculptures all have a baldachin and depict Maximilian I (Holy Roman Emperor), Philip I of Castile, Charles V (Holy Roman Emperor) and Ferdinand I (Holy Roman Emperor). The statues are replicas as the originals are stored away from the elements in the Basler Hof. The five emblems under each of the bay windows depict territorial dominions belonging to the House of Habsburg.

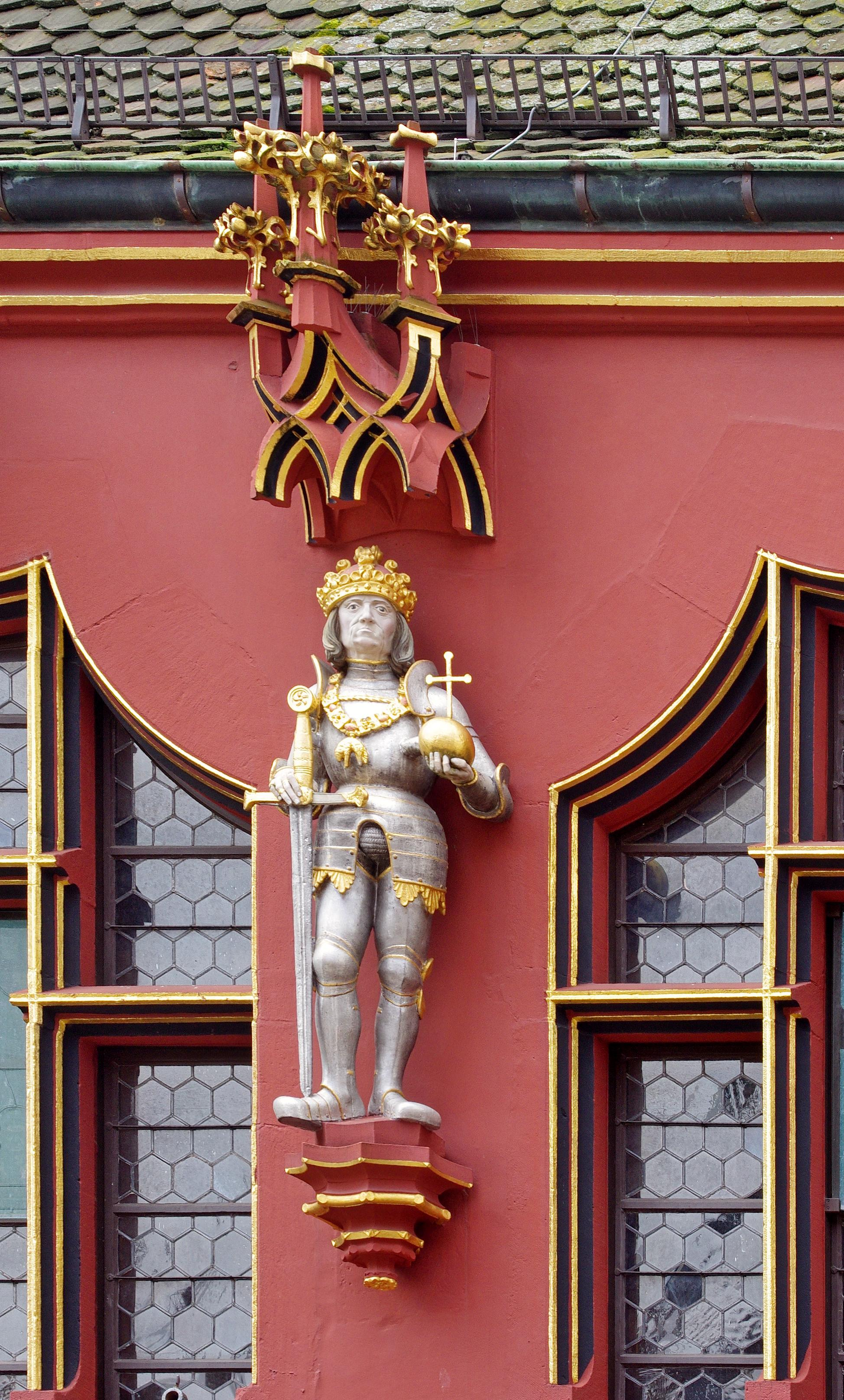
Maximilian I.

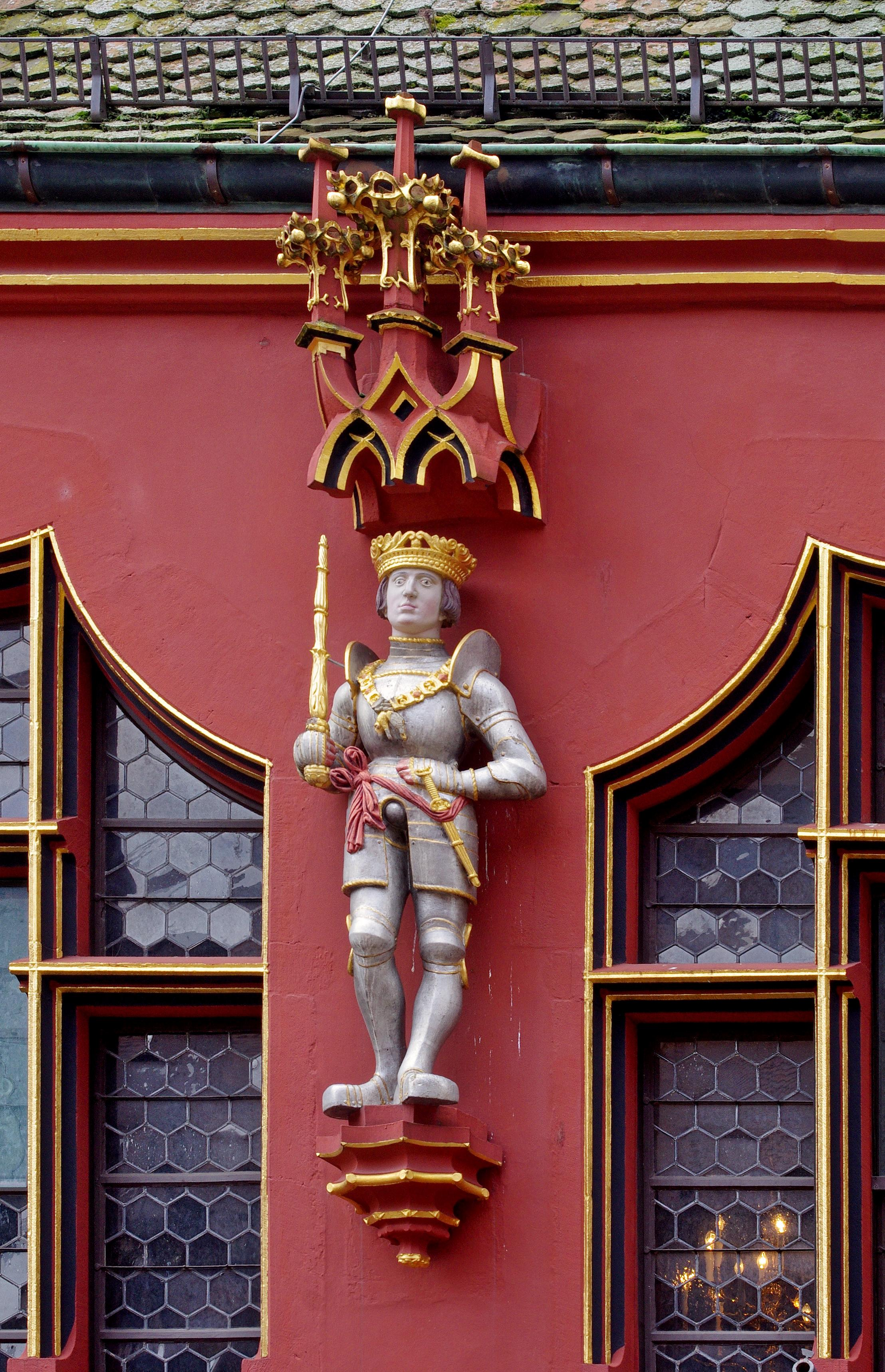
Philip I. of Castile

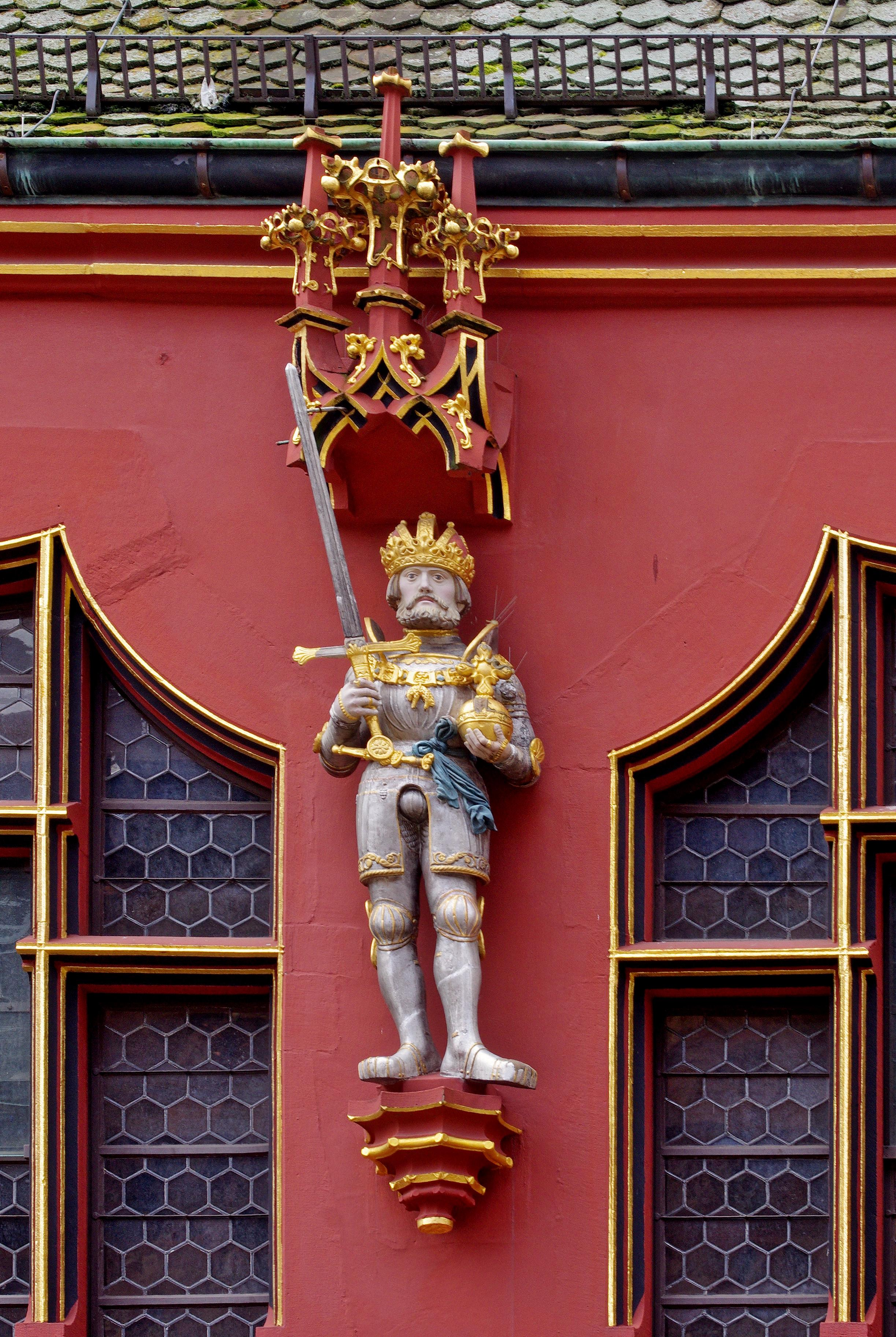
Charles V.

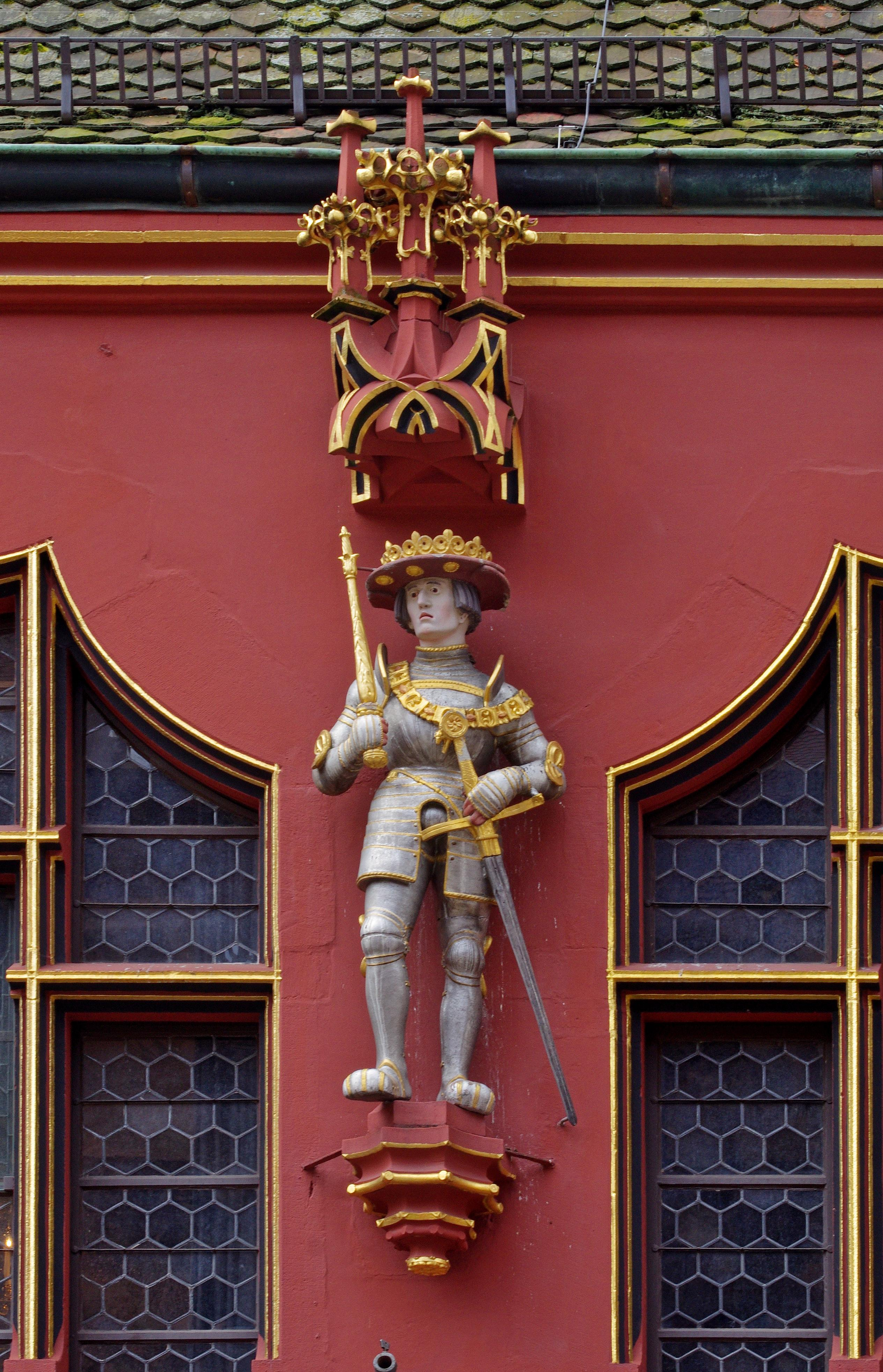
Ferdinand I.

The most significant room is the Emperors' Hall (Kaisersaal), which still serves as a prestigious venue and accommodates up to 350 people. The room has a painted stucco-ceiling. Portraits of the following dignitaries hang on the wall: the sovereigns of the House of Habsburg - Francis I, Holy Roman Emperor and his wife Maria Theresa, Joseph II, Holy Roman Emperor and his wife Princess Isabella of Parma as well as Francis II, Holy Roman Emperor . The Emperors' Hall also features stained glass windows. Despite the prominence of the House of Habsburg, the room was not named after Austrian Emperors, but after William I, German Emperor, who dined there in the course of the inauguration of the Siegesdenkmal in 1876.

Since 1776, the Emperors' Hall can be accessed by a stairway from the neighboring Redoutenhaus (building where dances and masquerades were held). On the first floor of the former Salt House (Salzhaus) is the foyer of the Emperors' Hall. On the second floor, the rooms of the Freiburg Society for History ( Geschichtsvereins Schau-ins-Land ) are situated. In 1878, the interiors were designed by Fritz Geiges. The inaugurational meeting of the Society for Baden Culture ( Landesverein Badische Heimat ) also took place in the Historical Merchants' Hall of Freiburg. In the part of the merchants' hall facing the Schusterstraße are two smaller rooms, which are located on the first floor and can also be used for events; the Kaminzimmer accommodates up to 90 people and has an impressive fireplace from the 15th century and the Rococo Room (Rokokosaal) has capacity for up to 70 people.
