= Elise Henle =

German writer (1832–1892)

Elise Henle Levi
- Born: Elise (Sara) Henle; 10 August 1832; Munich, Bavaria, German Confederation
- Died: 18 August 1892 (aged 60); Frankfurt am Main, Prussia, German Empire
- Resting place: Frankfurt Jewish Cemetery
- Spouse: Leopold Levi (m. 1853)
- Children: Mathilde Levi Sonnemann (1854–?)
- Writing career
- Language: German

Elise (Sara) Henle Levi (10 August 1832, Munich – 18 August 1892, Frankfurt am Main) was a German Jewish writer, dramatist, and poet. She was the author of numerous dramatic comedies, opera libretti, poems, and cookbooks.

== Biography ==
Elise Henle was born in Munich, Bavaria into a wealthy Jewish court factor family, the fifth of six children of Therese (née Ottenheimer) and Benedict (Baruch) Henle. Her father had made a name for himself as the author of geographical and horological reference books. He was the son of activist Elkan Henle and grandson of Rabbi Moshe Fränkel, and her mother the sister of poet Henriette Ottenheimer. Her brother Sigmund von Henle would become a prominent politician and lawyer of the Bavarian royal family. She was educated at the Aschersche Mädcheninstitut boarding school in Munich.

After her marriage in July 1853 to jewellery manufacturer Leopold Levi, Henle settled in Esslingen, Württemberg, where her house became the rendezvous of a distinguished society circle. Later, when her husband's company went bankrupt in 1881, she moved to Munich to live with her daughter. In 1889 she relocated to her widowed sister's home in Frankfurt am Main, where she died three years later. She was buried in the Frankfurt Jewish Cemetery in a funeral officiated by Rabbi Rudolf Reuben Plaut.

== Work ==
Elise Henle's first literary publication was the satirical poem Hut ab!, written in 1867 in response to an anti-Semitic statement by a judicial officer. it was followed by the sketch Beim Volkfest (1869), the novella Das Zweite Jägerbataillon (1869), and the narrative Die Wacht am Rhein (1870).

She entered the dramatic field successfully with the political comedy Der Zweite September, which was soon followed by the drama Percy (a free adaptation of Philipp Galen) and the libretto of Richard Kleinmichel's romantic-comic opera Manon, oder Schloß de l'Orme, based on Abbé Prévost's Histoire du Chevalier des Grieux et de Manon Lescaut. Her comedies Durch die Intendanz, Die Wiener in Stuttgart, Aus Göthes lustigen Tagen, Der Erbonkel, and Liebesqualen met with marked success in several German and Austrian theatres. The latter was performed at the Stadttheater in Altona on 27 November 1881. She also wrote the text of Murillo, an opera in three acts with music by Ferdinand Langer, first performed at the Mannheim National Theatre in 1887.

Near the end of her life, Henle published two popular Swabian German cookbooks in verse, Guat is's (1888) and So mag i's (1892, reprinted 1988).

=== Partial bibliography ===
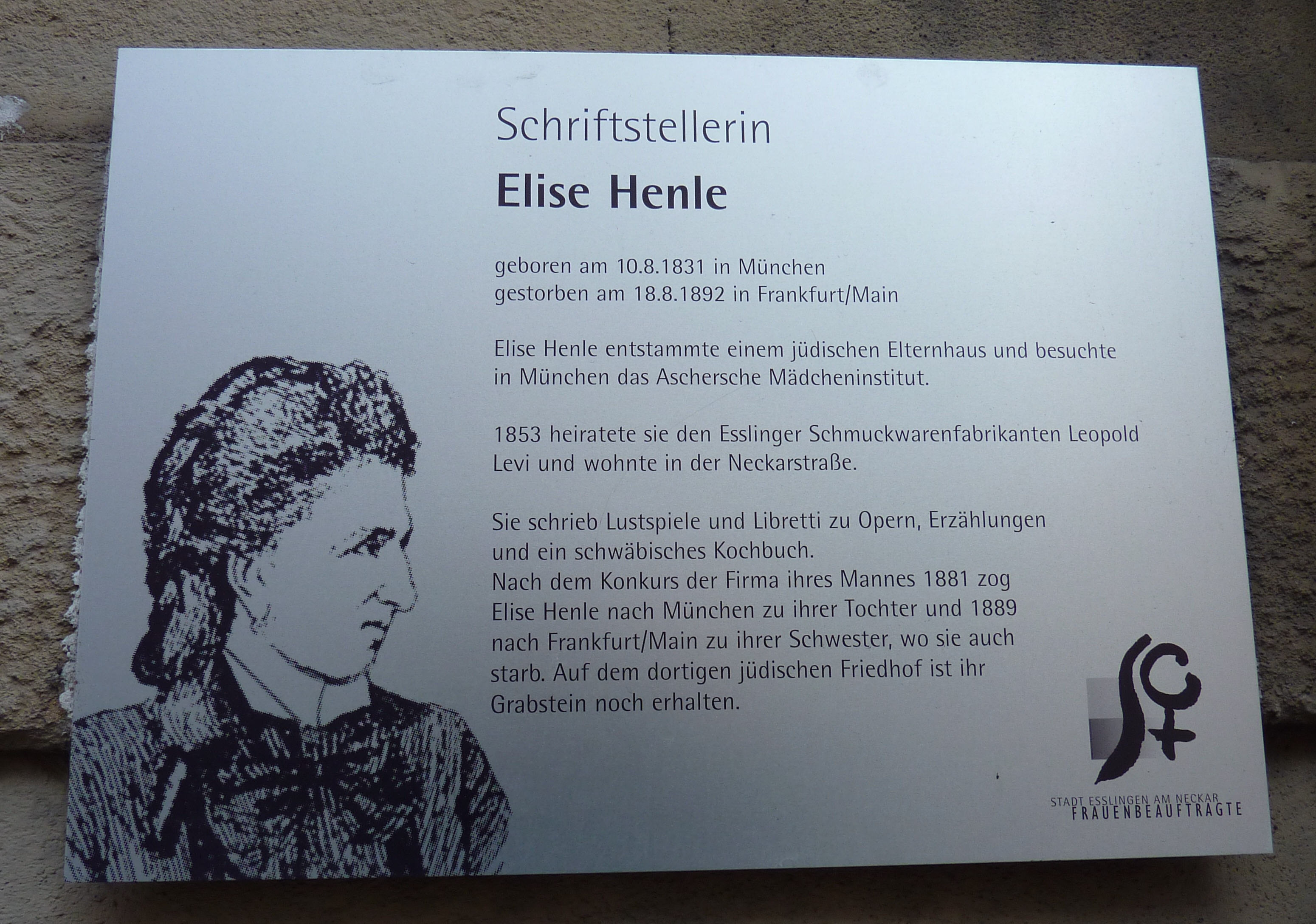
Plaque in tribute to Elise Henle at Neckarstraße 33 in Esslingen, where she lived from 1868 to 1881.

- Ein Duell. Lustspiel (in German). 1869.
- "Der Bayer und der Zuave". Fliegende Blätter (in German). 54 (1350). Munich: Verlag von Braun & Schneider. 1871.
- Durch die Intendanz. Original-Lustspiel in fünf Akten (in German). Leipzig: Druck von Oswald Mutze. 1877.
- Aus Göthes lustigen Tagen. Original-Lustspiel in vier Akten (in German). Stuttgart: Verlag von R. Levi. 1878.
- Die Wiener in Stuttgart. Lustspiel in fünf Akten (in German). Stuttgard: Levi. 1879.
- Entehrt. Schauspiel in fünf Akten (in German). Stuttgart: Greiner. 1879.
- Manon, oder Schloß de l'Orme. Romantisch-komische Oper in vier Akten (Libretto) (in German). Leipzig: Druck von Breitkopf und Härtel. 1880. Music by Richard Kleinmichel.
- Der Erbonkel. Lustspiel in fünf Aufzügen (in German). Leipzig: Reclam. 1881.
- Was soll ich deklamieren? Unter Mitwirkung und Förderung der ersten deutschen Bühnengrößen gesammelt und herausgegeben (in German). Stuttgart: Levy & Müller. 1885.
- Backfischchens Theaterfreuden. Ein Geschenk für große und kleine Fräuleins. Lustspiele (in German). Stuttgart: Levy & Müller. 1887.
- Murillo. Oper in vier Akten (Libretto) (in German). Mannheim: Haas. 1887. Music by Ferdinand Langer.
- Guat is's. Kochrecepte in oberbayrischer Mundart (in German). Munich: Braun & Schneider. 1888.
- Zeitgemäß. Excentrisch. Ruhbedürftig. Drei Bühnenwerke (in German). Leipzig: Elischer Nachf. 1890.
- Rosa von Tannenburg. Der Ring. Das Johanniskäferchen. Drei Schauspiele für die Jugend. Frei nach Christoph von Schmid für die Bühne bearbeitet (in German). Ravensburg: Otto Maier. 1891.
- So mag i's. Kochrecepte in schwäbischer Mundart. Eine Gabe für Bräute und junge Frauen oder Jungfrauen, welche Beides werden wollen (in German). Munich: Brann & Schneider. 1892. ISBN 9783954543946.
