= Johann Ihle =

Johann Ihle may refer to:

- Johann Abraham Ihle (1627–c.1699), German amateur astronomer
- Johann Eberhard Ihle (1727–1814), German painter
