= Deffner =

Deffner is a surname. Notable people with the surname include:

- Michael Deffner (1848–1934), German classical philologist and linguist
- Karl Deffner (1817–1877), German manufacturer, politician and geologist
- Sebastian Deffner, German theoretical physicist and a professor in the Department of Physics at the University of Maryland
