= Esslingen am Neckar =

Esslingen am Neckar Esslenga am Neckor (Swabian)
- City
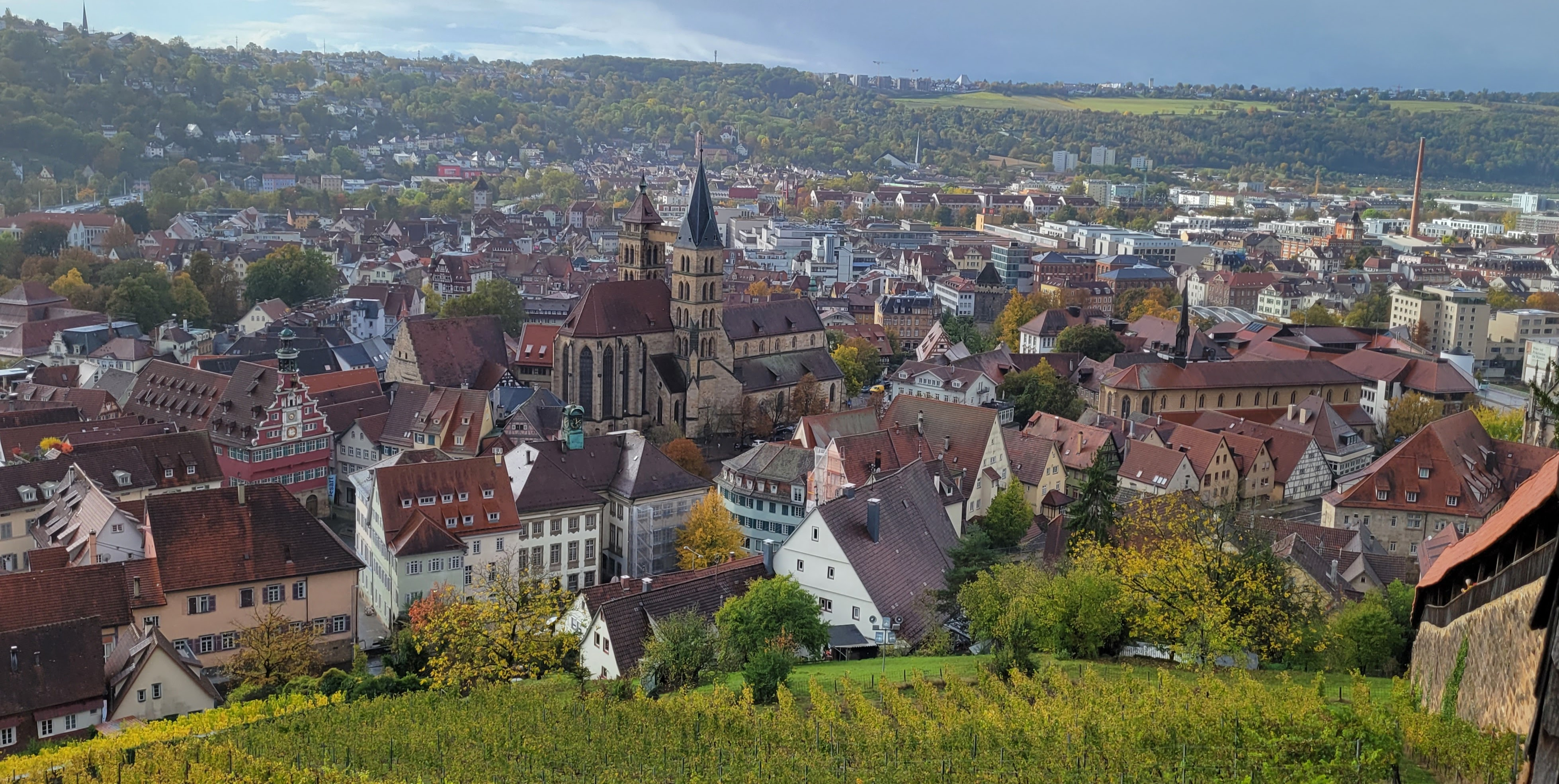

- Coat of arms

- Location of Esslingen am Neckar within Esslingen district
- Interactive map of Esslingen am Neckar
- Location within Germany Location within Baden-Württemberg
- Coordinates: 48°44′N 9°19′E
- Country: Germany
- State: Baden-Württemberg
- Admin. region: Stuttgart
- District: Esslingen

Government
  - Mayor (2021–29): Matthias Klopfer (SPD)

Area
  - Total: 46.43 km^{2} (17.93 sq mi)
- Elevation: 241 m (791 ft)

Population (2025-12-31)
  - Total: 95,419
  - Density: 2,055/km^{2} (5,323/sq mi)
- Time zone: UTC+01:00 (CET)
  - Summer (DST): UTC+02:00 (CEST)
- Postal codes: 73701–73734
- Dialling codes: 0711
- Vehicle registration: ES
- Website: www.esslingen.de

Esslingen am Neckar (German pronunciation: [ˈɛslɪŋən ʔam ˈnɛkaʁ], lit. 'Esslingen on the Neckar'; Alemannic German: Esslenga; until 16 October 1964 officially Eßlingen am Neckar) is a city in the Stuttgart Region of Baden-Württemberg in southern Germany, seat of the District of Esslingen. Within Baden-Württemberg it is the 10th largest city.

It is located on the river Neckar, about 14 kilometres (9 miles) southeast of Stuttgart city center. The regions surrounding the city of Esslingen are also mostly developed.

Esslingen is first mentioned in written records in the 8th century. From 1181, it was a Free Imperial City. In 1803, the city lost its independence and was incorporated into the Duchy of Württemberg. Industrialization in the 19th century led to economic growth and significantly shaped the city’s development.

The German Timber-Frame Road passes through the city.

== History ==
=== Prehistoric times ===
There is archaeological evidence that what is now the city of Esslingen was settled since the Neolithic period. Traces of human settlement found at the site of the city church date back to around 1000 B.C.

=== Roman times ===
In the 1st century AD the Esslingen region became part of the Roman Empire. During this period a Roman warehouse was located in the area of Oberesslingen. The nearest major Roman settlements and garrisons were at Cannstatt and Köngen.

=== Migration and Merovingian period ===
There are no known archaeological finds from the early period of Alemannic rule in the area, although such evidence does exist on the nearby Filder uplands. Finds from the district of Rüdern, however, point to a richly furnished grave with eastern influences, including, for example, a set of three-winged spearheads. The place-name ending "-ingen" indicates a settlement associated with a kinship group led by a man named Azzilo, Hezzilo, or Hetsilo, who likely was a landlord and family patriarch. The city’s name, therefore, originally meant "the people and land of Azzilo." This name is first documented in 856 as "Ezlinga" and again in 866 as "Hetsilinga", forms that eventually evolved into the modern name Esslingen.

In the 6th century, the Alemanni were subjugated by the Merovingians under king Clovis I. But they still took over administrative tasks and formed a Duchy in Francia. In the 8th century they tried to become sovereign again. But the attempt failed near Cannstatt. The end of the Alemannian duchy was marked with the Council of Cannstatt.

In an excavation by Günter Fehring, the remains of the Vitalis-Cella under the church St. Dionysius were uncovered. Proof of settlement dates back to the late Merovingian period. Even older are the single row graves in Oberesslingen and Sirnau.

=== Middle Ages ===
Esslingen was first mentioned in 777 in the last will of Abbot Fulrad from Saint-Denis (near Paris), the chaplain of Pippin and Charlemagne. He bequeathed the sixth cell upon the river Neckar that he had received from an Alemannic nobleman by the name of "Hafti" to his monastery, Saint-Denis. He also brought the bones of Saint Vitalis to Esslingen, which made it a destination for pilgrims and led to its growth.

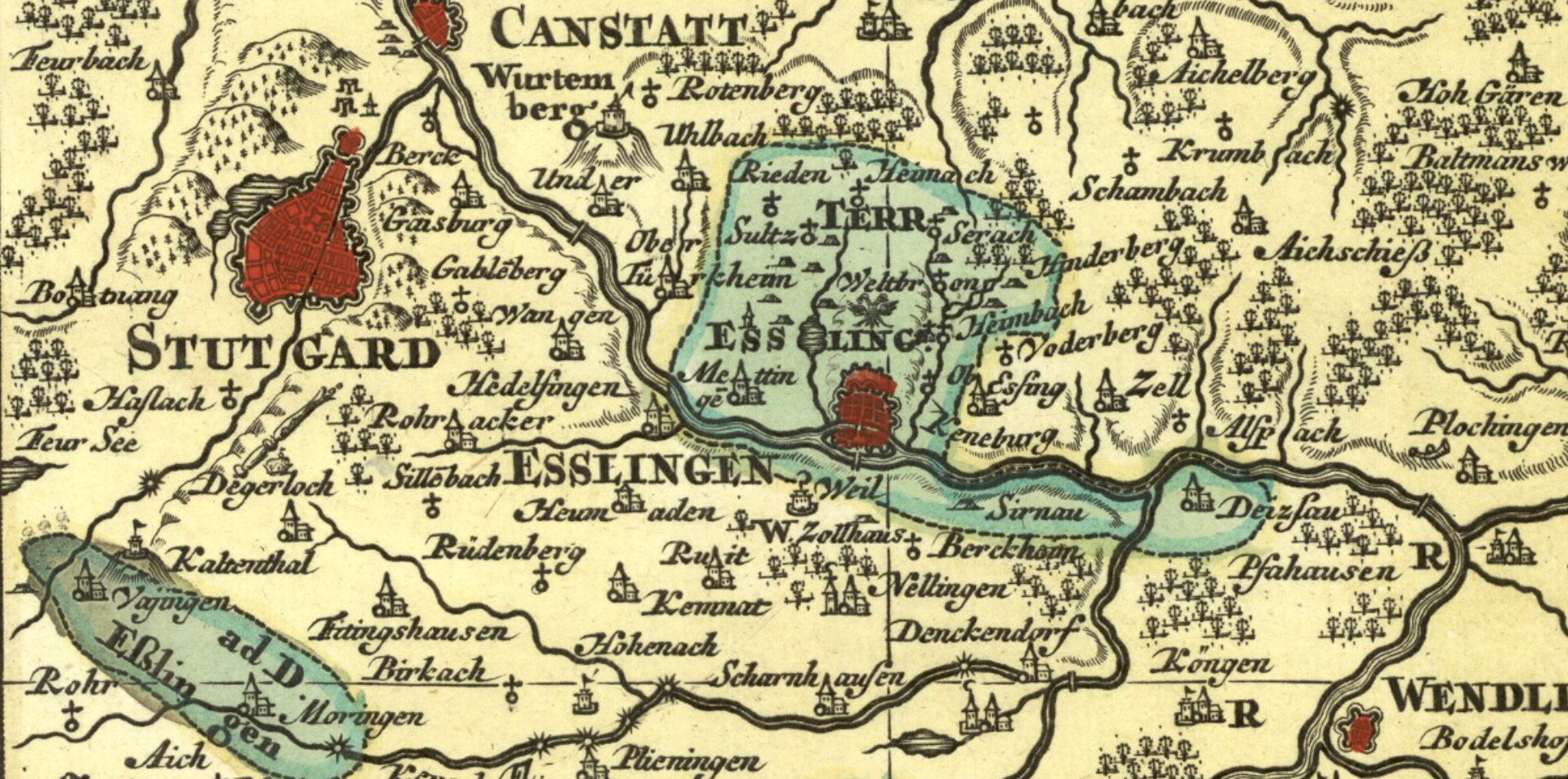
Territory of the Free Imperial City of Esslingen

Around 800 Esslingen became a market town, its market rights being certified in 866. In 949–953 it was a possession of Liudolf, Duke of Swabia. Esslingen received city rights in 1229 under Emperor Frederick II. During the same period the still-extant Neckar bridge was built, making Esslingen a major center for trade on the route between Italy, Switzerland, and northern Germany. Taxes provided by the bridge and market led to further growth of the town, as did the export of the highly regarded wines from the region.

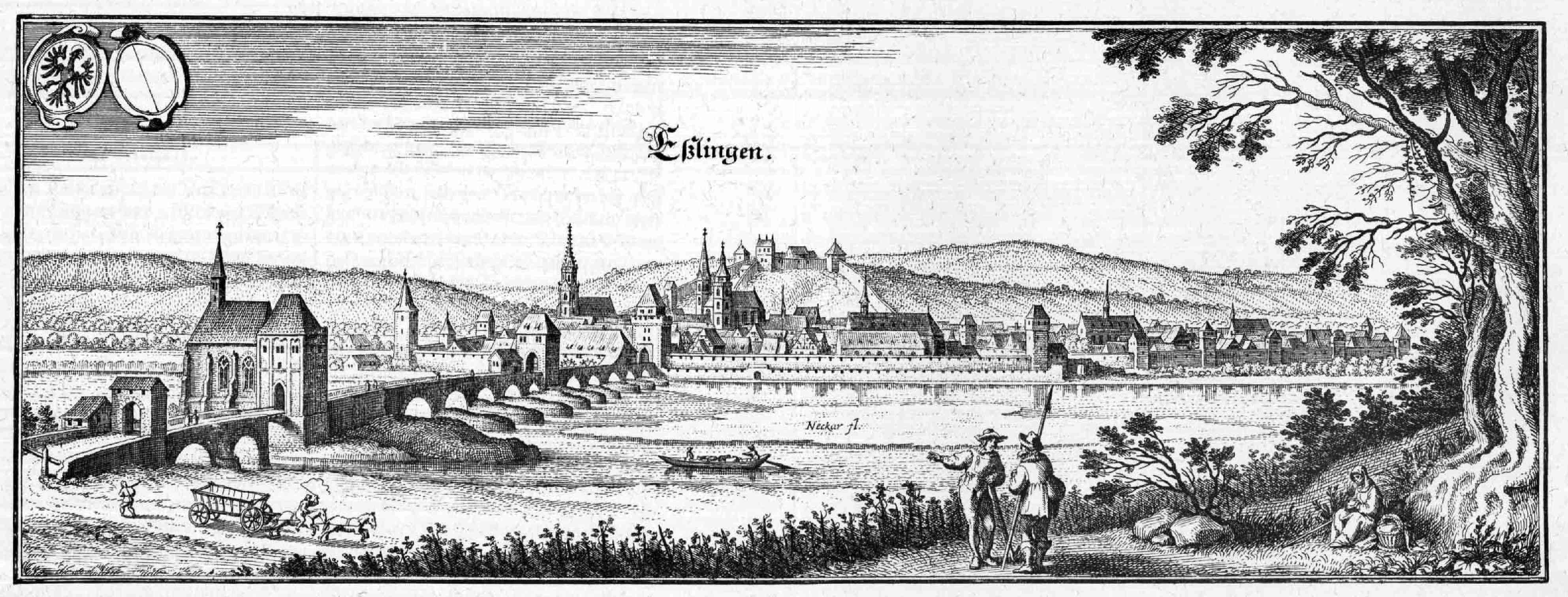
View of Esslingen c. 1640, showing the bridge over the Neckar River

The period between the 13th century and 16th century saw many conflicts between the Free Imperial City and the Counts of Württemberg (later Duchy of Württemberg). About half the population died in the Thirty Years' War between 1618 and 1648 through famine or epidemics. Esslingen lost its independence as an Imperial city during the Napoleonic era in 1802–1803, becoming part of the Duchy of Württemberg.

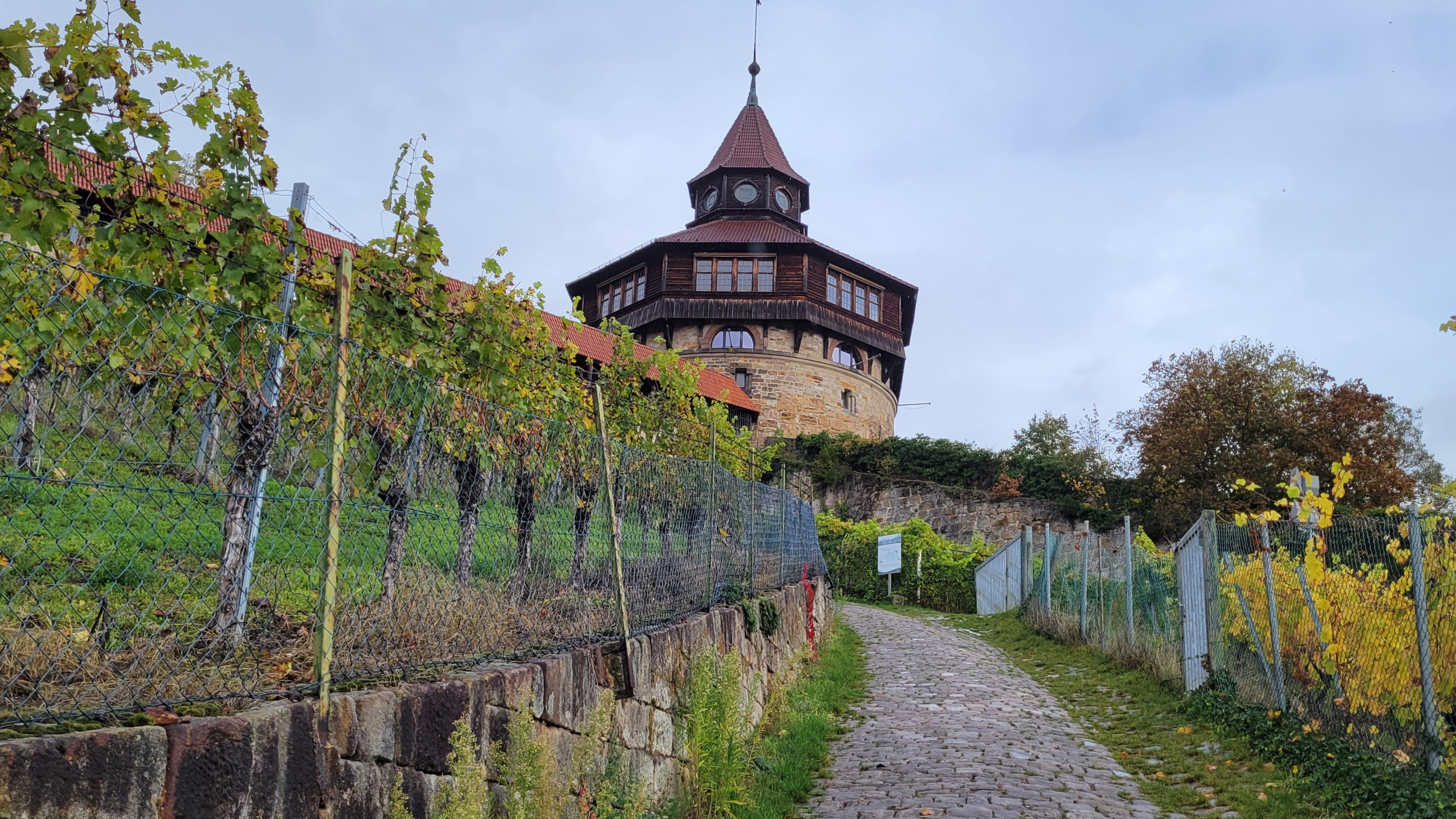
"The Fat Tower", part of the remaining defensive bastion of the city

The city had a defensive wall, part of which remains, including a landmark "fat tower" (Der Dicke Turm) set on the hill and vineyards above the city. A marketplace plaza at the center of the city is ringed by characteristic half-timbered buildings. A landmark "old city hall" (Altes Rathaus) stands nearby.

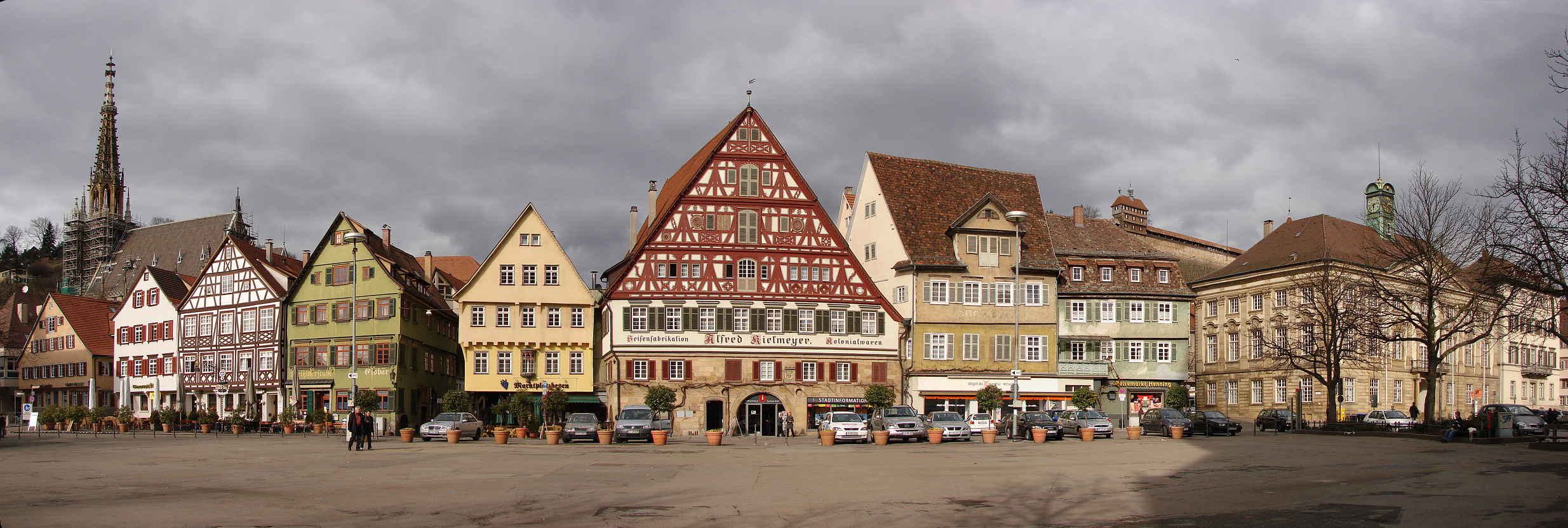
Esslingen marketplace

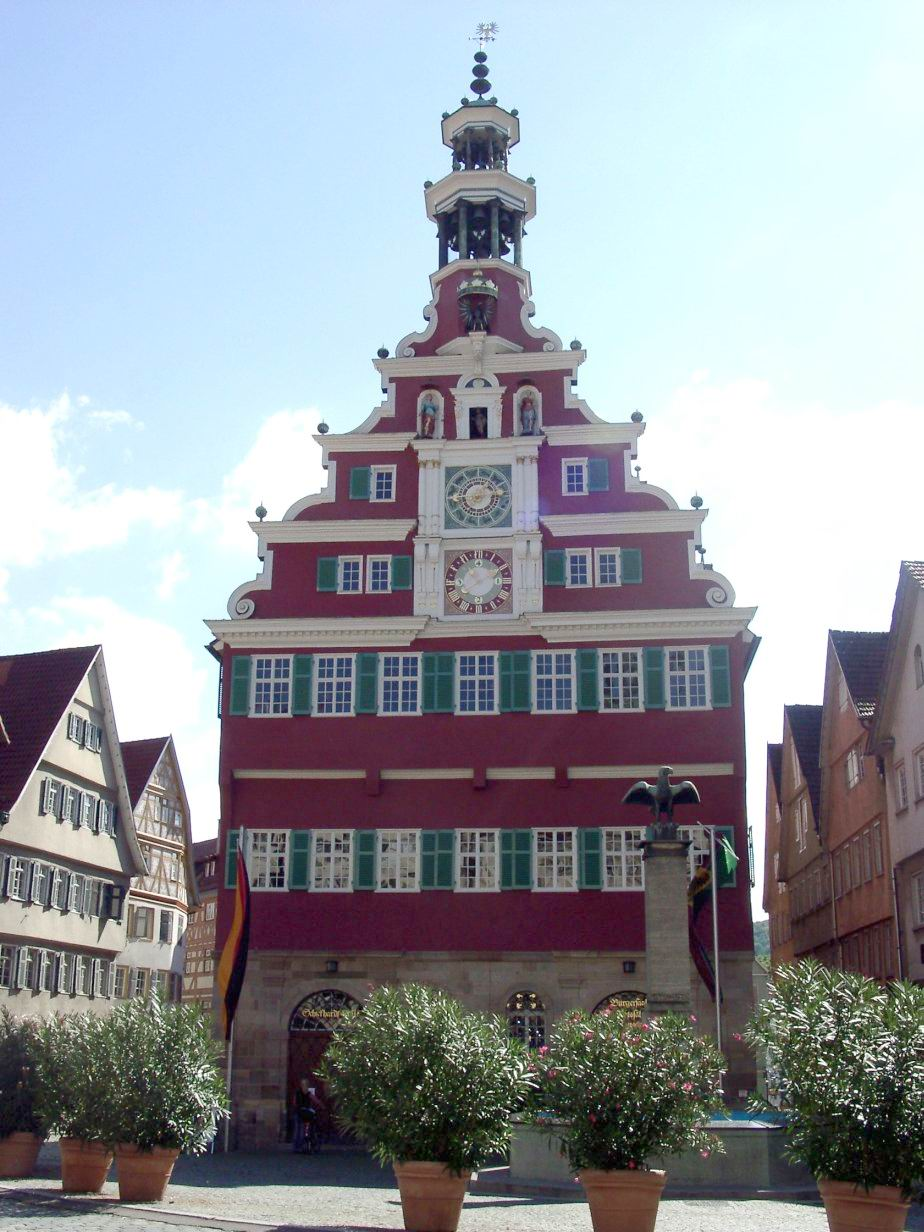
Front facade of the old city hall

=== 19th century to present ===
The beginning of the 19th century was characterized by industrialization. Glove manufacturing, food processing, textiles, and metal working were early industries in Esslingen. On 20 November 1845 the first train ran from Cannstatt to Esslingen station.

Esslingen was occupied by U.S. troops starting in April 1945, at the very end of World War II. During the war the city suffered very little damage, and it was peaceably surrendered to the approaching allied forces, thus the medieval character of its city center has been mostly preserved.

After the Second World War about 47,000 people moved to Esslingen, mostly refugees and displaced persons from East Germany. Housing developments in Oberesslingen and Zollberg were created to overcome the shortage of housing.

In 1973 Nürtingen district was merged with Esslingen am Neckar, making Esslingen the seat of a much enlarged district.

== Demography ==
Largest groups of immigrants as of 31 December 2020 were:

Turkey	4,182
Greece	3,030
Italy	2,051
Croatia	1,711
Romania	1,248
Syria	1,102
Kosovo	784
Poland	713
Bosnia and Herzegovina	708
Serbia	472

== Climate ==
Climate data for Esslingen am Neckar (1991–2020)
Month	Jan	Feb	Mar	Apr	May	Jun	Jul	Aug	Sep	Oct	Nov	Dec	Year
Mean daily maximum °C (°F)	3.0 (37.4)	5.1 (41.2)	9.5 (49.1)	13.9 (57.0)	18.4 (65.1)	21.4 (70.5)	23.7 (74.7)	23.2 (73.8)	20.0 (68.0)	14.5 (58.1)	8.0 (46.4)	4.0 (39.2)	13.7 (56.7)
Mean daily minimum °C (°F)	−2.8 (27.0)	−1.9 (28.6)	0.8 (33.4)	4.0 (39.2)	8.0 (46.4)	11.2 (52.2)	12.9 (55.2)	12.5 (54.5)	9.4 (48.9)	5.4 (41.7)	1.2 (34.2)	−1.6 (29.1)	4.9 (40.9)
Average precipitation mm (inches)	46.9 (1.85)	41.4 (1.63)	50.4 (1.98)	45.7 (1.80)	88.0 (3.46)	86.0 (3.39)	95.6 (3.76)	80.7 (3.18)	57.0 (2.24)	60.8 (2.39)	59.5 (2.34)	56.3 (2.22)	768.3 (30.24)
Average rainy days	13.2	11.3	14.3	14.3	19.6	18.6	17.8	16.8	11.5	12	11.5	13.4	174.3
Average relative humidity (%)	90	83	74	69	70	71	69	70	75	81	85	90	77
Mean monthly sunshine hours	62	90.4	136.4	174	213.9	228	254.2	232.5	183	130.2	75	58.9	1,838.5
Mean daily sunshine hours	2	3.2	4.4	5.8	6.9	7.6	8.2	7.5	6.1	4.2	2.5	1.9	5.0
Mean daily daylight hours	8.8	10.2	11.9	13.7	15.3	16.1	15.7	14.3	12.6	10.8	9.2	8.4	12.3
Source: Deutscher Wetterdienst (Precipitation), Weather2visit, Weather Atlas (Rainy days and Daylight)

== Transport ==
=== Air ===
Stuttgart Airport, the largest airport in Baden-Württemberg, is located in the Esslingen District, roughly ten kilometers south of the town, on the border with the town of Leinfelden-Echterdingen. A plane owned by Lufthansa has been named after the town.

The junction on the Bundesautobahn 8 Karlsruhe-Munich which serves Esslingen is just after the airport when traveling towards Munich.

=== Road ===
Esslingen is directly on the B10 State Highway which runs as a dual carriageway from Stuttgart to Süßen, and continues onward to Ulm. The exit for Esslingen, just after the B10 passes under the ancient Pliensau Bridge, is particularly unusual, because in the direction of Ulm there are two entry and exit points to the dual carriageway. This makes it is possible to reach the center of Esslingen directly from Stuttgart, and to drive from central Esslingen directly onto the Dual Carriageway in the direction of Ulm without having to pass traffic lights.

Despite the six to eight lanes on the new Pliensau Bridge and the surrounding roads, the infrastructure around Pliensauvorstadt and the route to Zollberg still suffers from frequent congestion.

Esslingen is also on the German Timber-Frame Road.

=== Railways ===
Esslingen (Neckar) station is on the Fils Valley Railway and is served by line S 1 of the Stuttgart S-Bahn and regional services. The town is on the main rail line between Stuttgart and Ulm, operated by Deutsche Bahn, the main German rail operator. In 2009, the company named a high speed 'Intercity-Express' train "Esslingen-am-Neckar".

=== S-Bahn ===
The Stuttgart S-Bahn line S1 which operates between Kirchheim-unter-Teck and Herrenberg via Stuttgart centre, serves the stations of Mettingen, Esslingen (Neckar), Oberesslingen and Esslingen (Zell). Under the planned rebuilding of the railways in central Stuttgart under the Stuttgart 21 scheme, the S1 will be shortened to operate from Kirchheim unter Teck as far as Stuttgart Schwabstraße station.

=== Direct bus connection to Stuttgart Airport ===
To avoid the long S-Bahn route to the airport via Stuttgart, the Bus 122, operated by the END Company, now runs directly from the central bus and rail interchange to the airport via Ostfildern Scharnhausen.

=== Urban Tramway ===
The Esslingen Urban Tram system was opened in May 1912 and closed on 7 July 1944 after 32 years of operation. It was replaced by trolley buses. The operating company, the Esslinger Städtische Straßenbahn (ESS, translated Esslingen Town Tramway) changed its name in 1944 to the Städtischer Verkehrsbetrieb Esslingen (SVE, or "Esslingen Transport Company").

=== Former Interurban Tram ===
On 18 December 1926 the Esslingen-Nellingen-Denkendorf (END) interurban tram began operating. This was the last tram system to be built in Germany before the wave of closures later in the century: after this date permission from the authorities was only given for extensions to existing systems. The tram had to negotiate a five kilometer gradient out of the Neckar Valley to reach the towns and villages of the Eastern Filder region. In total, the system transported 153 million passengers from Denkendorf and later from Neuhausen to Esslingen, and took delivery of two new open trams in 1958. The line was discontinued in February 1978.

=== Trolley bus and diesel bus ===
Esslingen, along with Solingen and Eberswalde, is one of the last three German towns which still use trolleybuses. The SVE currently operates two lines using electric power:

101: Oberesslingen Lerchenacker Endstation – Esslingen railway station – Stuttgart-Obertürkheim station.

118: Esslingen Railway Station – Zollberg.

Apart from this around 50 taxis operate in the town.

=== Car-Sharing ===
In 1994 A car-sharing company opened a station in Esslingen.

=== Rebuilding of bus/rail interchange ===
An ambitious redevelopment project has been in progress since 2004 in the area near the railway station. The current phase of this project is a large redevelopment of the station forecourt costing about 7.4 million euros. The Baden-Württemberg State Environment and Transport ministry helped fund this with a grant of 4.9 million euros. During 2009 the Neckarstraße was diverted along unused land on the railway station and lengthened to the west of the site. The next phase, completed in November 2014, was a large-scale redevelopment of the station forecourt to create a bus and rail interchange.

== Education ==
The city is home to the Esslingen University of Applied Sciences (German: Hochschule Esslingen). It is known for its mechanical engineering and automotive engineering courses, and also for its three international master's programs (MBA in International Industrial Management, MEng in Automotive Systems, MEng in Design and Development in Automotive and Mechanical Engineering), which are organised by the Esslingen Graduate School and taught completely in English.

== Twin towns – sister cities ==
Esslingen am Neckar is twinned with:

- Coimbatore, India
- Eger, Hungary
- Maladzyechna, Belarus
- Neath Port Talbot, United Kingdom
- Norrköping, Sweden
- Piotrków Trybunalski, Poland
- Schiedam, Netherlands
- Sheboygan, United States
- Udine, Italy
- Velenje, Slovenia
- Vienne, France

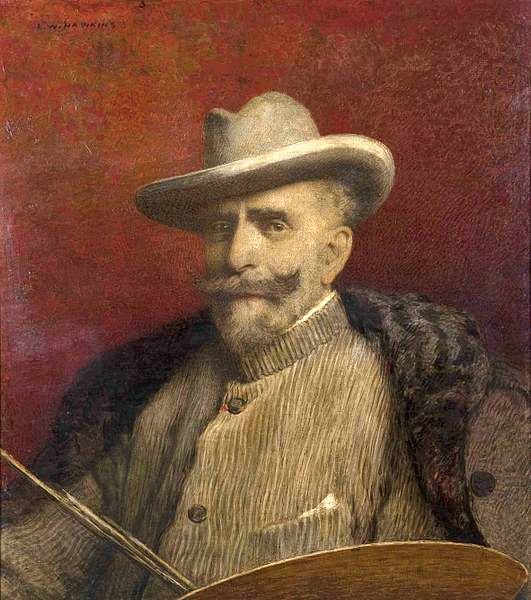
Louis Welden Hawkins c. 1890

== People ==
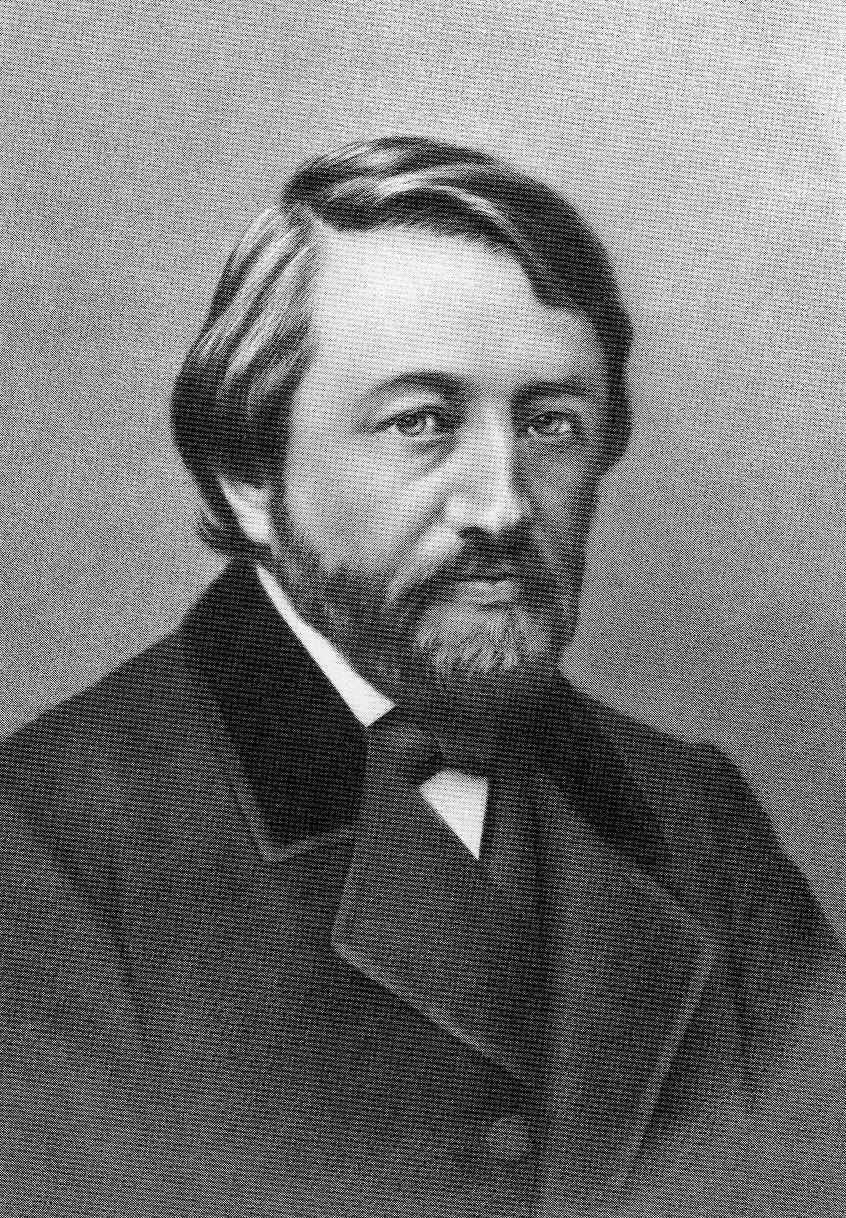
Karl Deffner, c. 1870

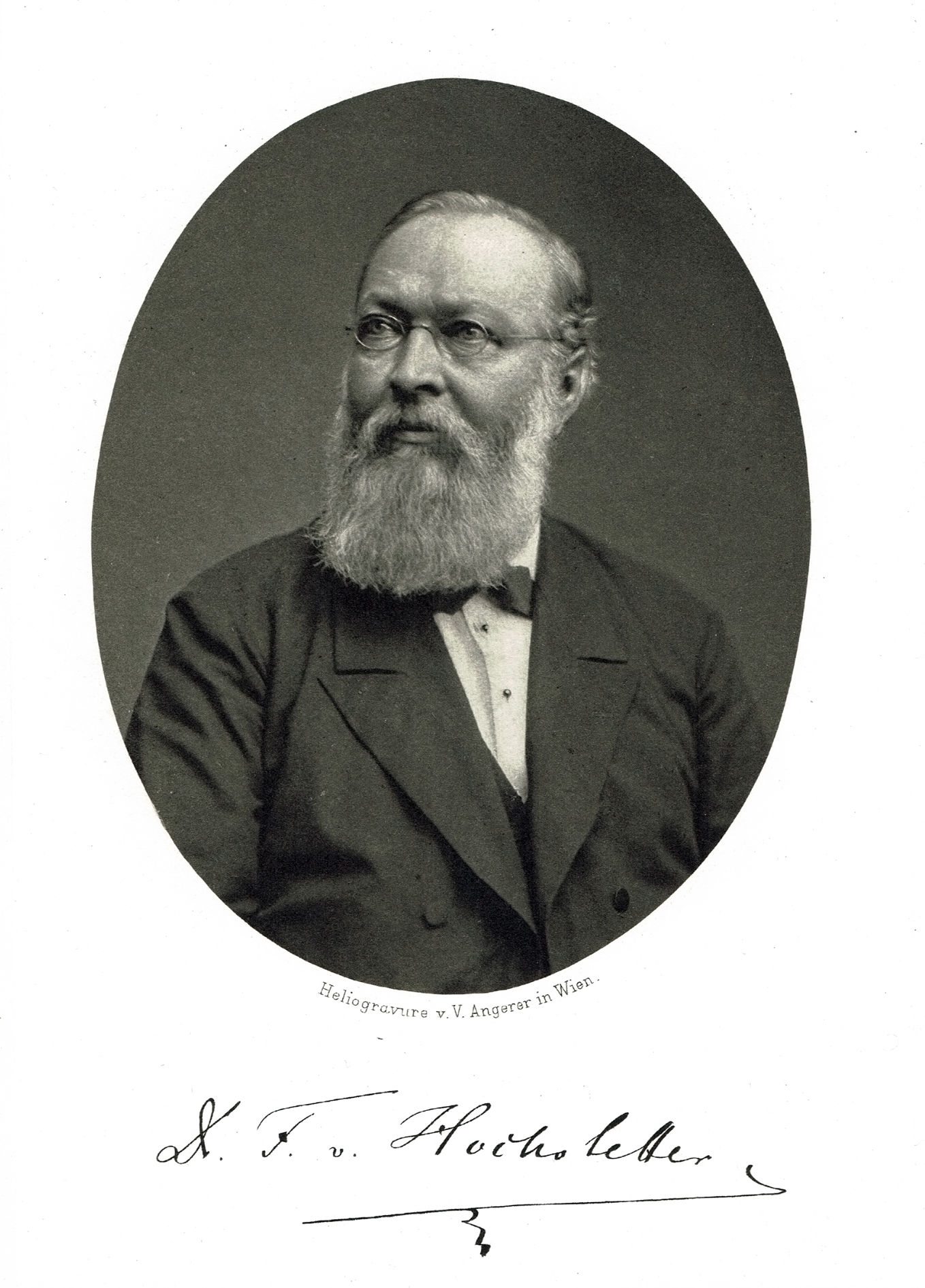
Ferdinand von Hochstetter, 1876

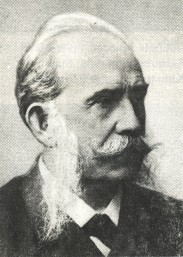
Julius Motteler

- Janina Baechle (born 1969), operatic mezzo-soprano.
- Richard Baum (1902–2000), musicologist and music historian
- Thommie Bayer (born 1953), writer, musician and painter
- Marie Daiber (1868–1928), zoologist
- Karl Deffner (1817–1877), manufacturer, politician and geologist.
- Isabelle Faust (born 1972), violinist, both soloist and chamber musician.
- Adolf Fleischmann (1892–1968), abstract painter, his late work evolved into constructivism
- Sebastian Franck (1499– ca.1543), freethinker, humanist, and radical reformer; local soapboiler 1531-1533.
- Albert Günther (1830–1914), British zoologist, ichthyologist and herpetologist; born locally
- Wolfgang Fritz Haug (born 1936), philosopher, coined the term commodity aestheticism
- Louis Welden Hawkins (1849–1910), English and French painter
- Elise Henle (1832–1892), a German Jewish writer, dramatist, and poet; lived locally 1853-1881
- Ernst von Herzog (1834–1911), classical philologist and archaeologist, and expert in the field of Roman epigraphy.
- Ferdinand von Hochstetter (1829–1884), geographer, geologist and natural scientist.
- Johann Eberhard Ihle (1727–1814), portrait painter
- Tobias Mayer (1723–1762), astronomer, studied the Moon, brought up locally.
- Julius Motteler (1838–1907), leading member of the early German workers' movement, Reichstag deputy
- Wilhelm Murr (1888–1945), German politician (NSDAP), Gauleiter
- Rolf Nesch (1893–1975), a German-born Norwegian expressionist artist, noted for printmaking
- Georg Restle (born 1965), journalist and television presenter.
- Ferdinand F. Rohm (1843–1917), chief bugler during the American Civil War, awarded the U.S. Medal of Honor
- Paula Rueß (1902–1980), German resistance fighter (French Resistance) and feminist
- Ralf Scheepers (born 1965), singer and lead vocalist for heavy metal band Primal Fear
- Ulrike Sonntag (born 1959), operatic soprano and academic voice teacher
- Johann Christian Friedrich Steudel (1779–1837), Lutheran theologian, proponent of rational supernaturalism
- Michael Stifel (1487–1567), a German monk, Protestant reformer and mathematician.

=== Sport ===
- Cristian Fiél (born 1980), Spanish-German football player, played over 360 games
- Manuel Hartmann (born 1984), former footballer who played 346 games
- Helmut Krausser (born 1964), author, poet, playwright, composer and professional chess player
- Rüdiger Kauf (born 1975), former professional footballer who played 369 games
- Otto Merz (1889–1933), racing car driver, chauffeur and mechanic.
- Max Sailer (1882–1964), racing car driver and engineerl headed racing by Mercedes
- Serdar Tasci (born 1987), former footballer who played 292 games and 14 for Germany
