= Oscar Fraas =

German clergyman, paleontologist and geologist

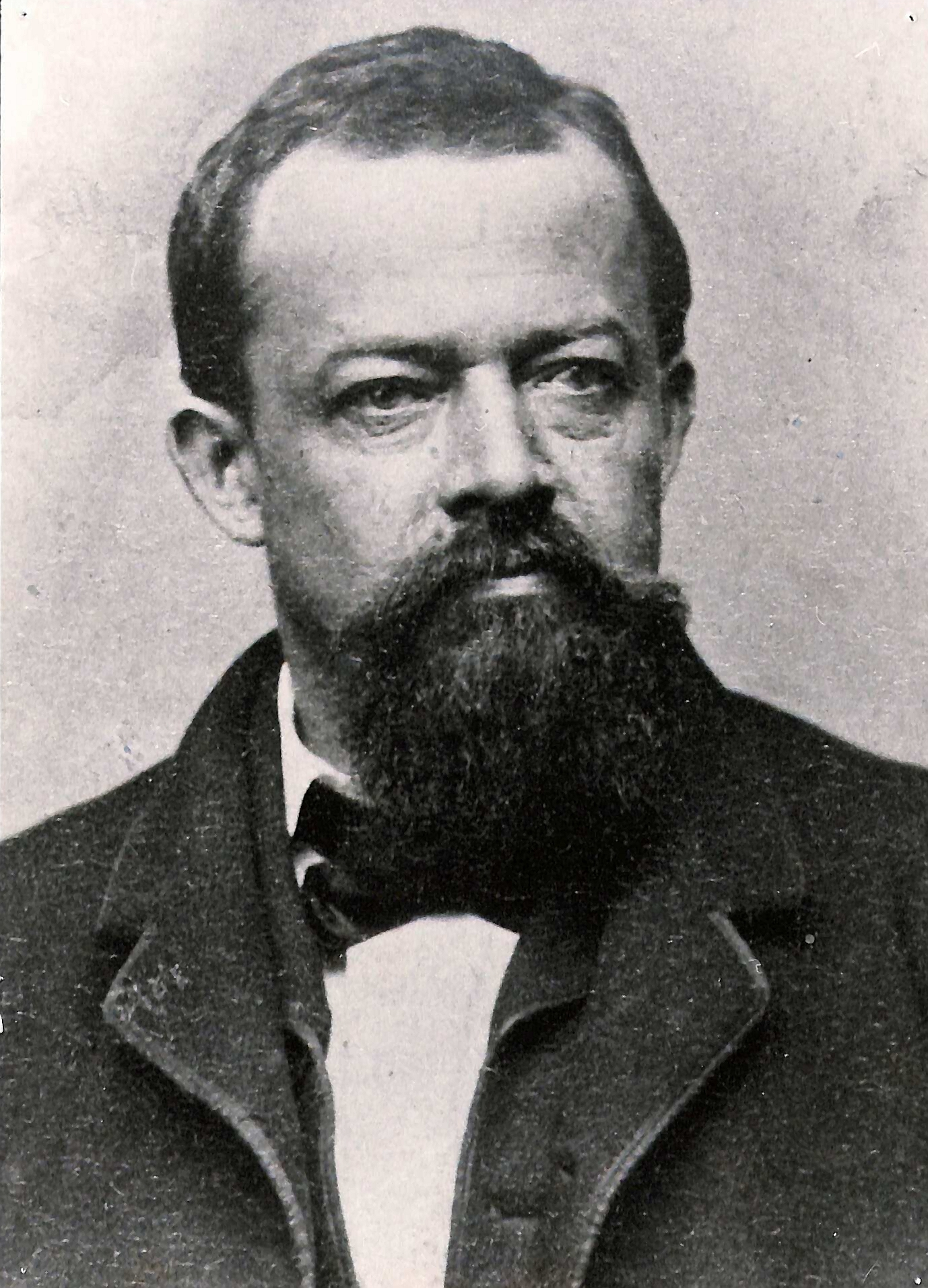
Oscar Friedrich von Fraas

Oscar Friedrich von Fraas (17 January 1824 in Lorch (Württemberg) – 22 November 1897 in Stuttgart) was a German clergyman, paleontologist and geologist. Fraas was a physico-theologist and saw fossil evidence in the light of the "Great Flood" of the Bible. He was the father of geologist Eberhard Fraas (1862–1915).

== Biography ==
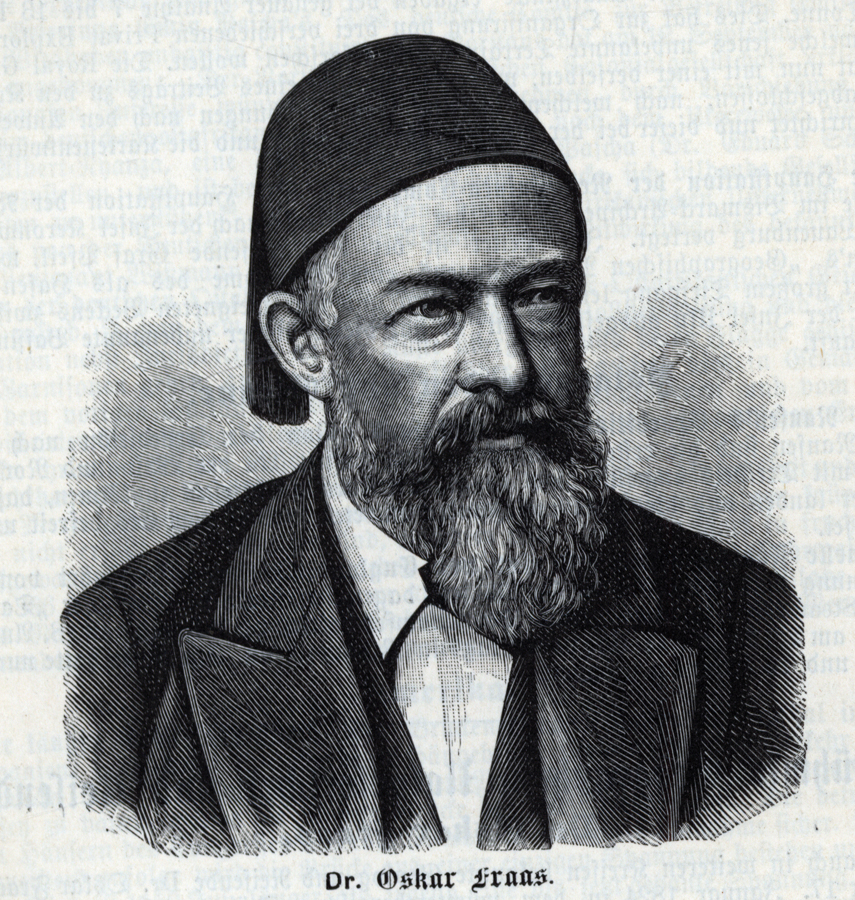

Fraas was born in Lorch, the son of pastor Christoph Friedrich (1791–1861) and Ernestine née Neuffer. He studied theology at the University of Tübingen (ministry exam, 1845). He was also deeply interested in natural sciences, and while a student at Tübingen was influenced by geologist Friedrich August von Quenstedt. In 1847 he travelled to Paris, where he attended lectures given by Alcide d'Orbigny and Jean-Baptiste Élie de Beaumont. From 1850 to 1854, he served as a pastor in Laufen an der Eyach, and in the meantime obtained a doctorate from the University of Würzburg (1851) with a study of the Swabian Jura. In 1854 he was named curator of the department of mineralogy and paleontology at the Royal Württemberg museum of natural history in Stuttgart, where he greatly added to its collections of Swabian fossil batrachians, reptiles and mammals. He excavated fossils at Schussen spring in Upper Swabia and Bear Cave in Hohlenstein where he noted human remains from the Ice Age.

With Karl Deffner (1817–1877), he conducted a geological survey of Württemberg, and in the field of applied geology, he made contributions towards the Swabian Albwasserversorgung (Schwäbian Alb water supply project). In addition to his geological and paleontological studies of Württemberg, he conducted scientific investigations of the Middle East, based on travels to the region in 1864–65 and 1875. He was a guest of Rustem Pasha of Mutasarrifat in 1875 in Mount Lebanon. As a result of his Middle Eastern travels in Egypt, Syria and Lebanon, he published the two part Aus dem Orient (1867, 1878). After returning he became interested in vineyards, became a member of the Society for Wine Improvement in Württemberg, and he built a home in Eugensplatz called Villa Lebanon where he lived in 1883.

Fraas was a critic of Darwinism and evolution. He believed in a biblical flood and held creationist views. He authored the book Vor der Sündfluth (Before the Flood) in 1866.

== Selected works ==
- Die nutzbaren Minerale Württembergs. Stuttgart: Ebner & Seubert, 1860.
- Vor der Sündfluth (1866)
- Aus dem Orient, 2 Theile, Stuttgart 1867–1878.
  - [Theil 1], Geologische Beobachtungen am Nil, auf der Sinai-Halbinsel und in Syrien. Stuttgart: Ebner & Seubert, 1867.
  - [Theil 2], Geologische Beobachtungen am Lebanon. Stuttgart: Schweizerbart, 1878.
- Die geognostische Sammlung Württembergs im Erdgeschoss des Königlichen Naturalien-Cabinets zu Stuttgart. Ein Führer für die Besucher desselben, 1869
- Geognostiche beschreibung von Württemberg : Baden und Hohenzollern, 1882.
