= Thommie Bayer =

German writer, musician and painter

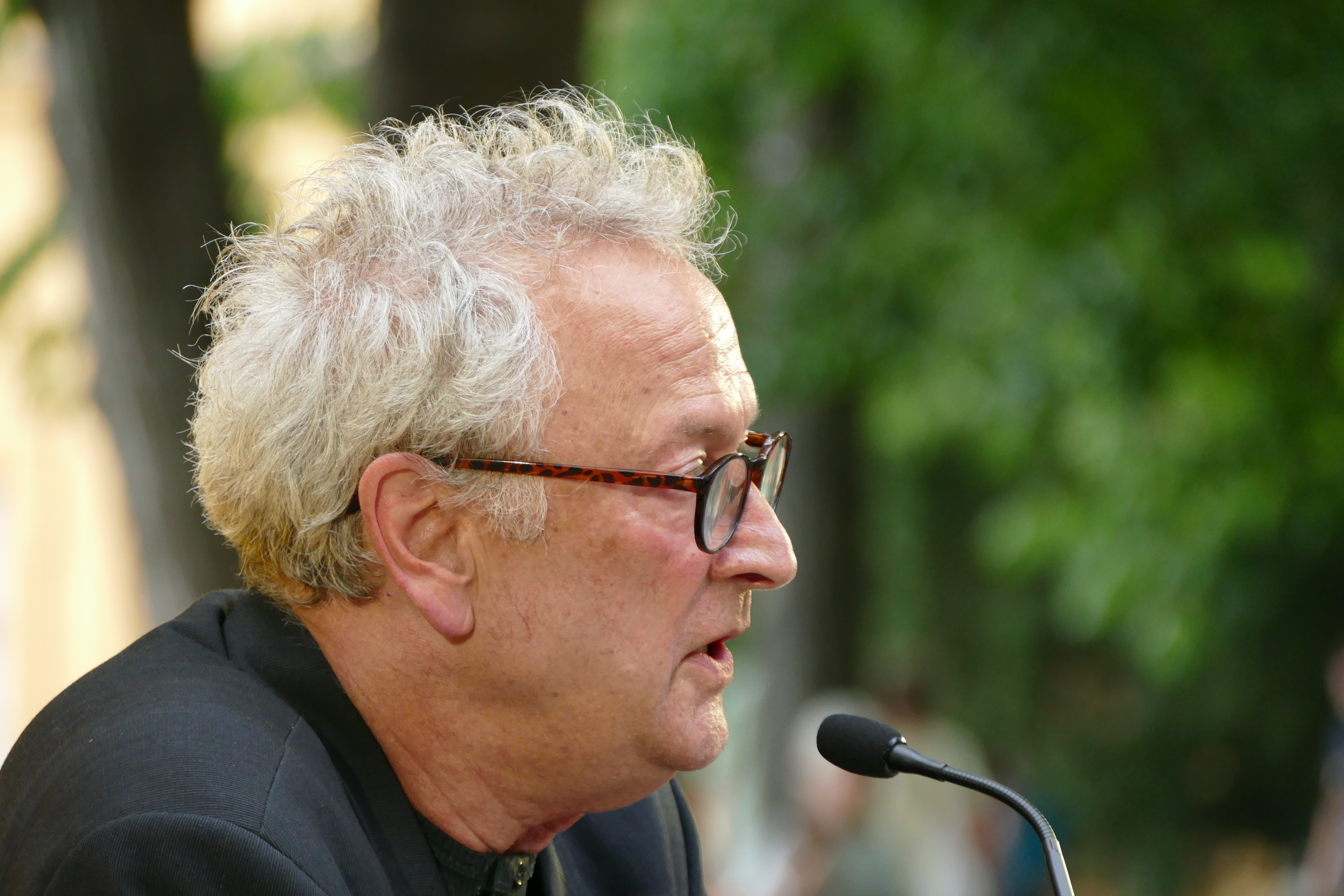
Thommie Bayer

Thommie Bayer (Thomas Bayer-Heer, born 22 April 1953) is a German writer, musician and painter.

Bayer was born in Esslingen am Neckar, near Stuttgart (where he attended school). From 1972 to 1978, he studied at the Stuttgart State Academy of Art and Design.

From 1974, he was a musician, first with the duo Thommie und Tomaske, then with his own band, the Thommie Bayer Band. He often shared the stage with friends Thomas C. Breuer and Bernhard Lassahn. His most successful hit was in 1979 with "Der letzte Cowboy kommt aus Gütersloh".

He continued playing music in the 1980s, having successes with "Alles geregelt" and "Rita", but concentrated on writing.

== Select discography ==
- Du wartest auf den Regentropfen, 1976 (LP)
- Silchers Rache, 1978 (LP)
- Abenteuer, 1979 (LP)
- Feindliches Gebiet, 1980 (LP)
- Kamikaze Bodenpersonal, 1981 (LP)
- Paradies, 1982 (LP)
- Was ist los?, 1983 (LP)
- Alles geregelt, 1984 (LP)
- Fliegender Teppich von Gleis 8, 1988 (CD)
- Das blaue Wunder, 1996 (CD)
- Cowboys und Indianer, 1998 (CD)

== Literary works ==
- Wir, die wir mitten im Leben stehen, mit beiden Beinen in der Scheiße, Trier 1977 (with Thomas C. Breuer)
- Über Menschen & unter Menschen, Trier 1979 (with Thomas C. Breuer)
- Eine Überdosis Liebe, Reinbek bei Hamburg 1985
- Einsam, zweisam, dreisam, Reinbek bei Hamburg 1987
- Die frohe Botschaft, abgestaubt und frisch gefaßt, Zürich 1989
- Sellavie ist kein Gemüse, Weinheim [u.a.] 1990
- Es ist nicht alles Kunst, was glänzt ..., Weinheim [u.a.] 1991
- Das Herz ist eine miese Gegend, Reinbek bei Hamburg 1991
- Spatz in der Hand, Frankfurt am Main 1992
- Sponto, Carla, Mike und Bobby McGee, Bielefeld 1992
- Der Himmel fängt über dem Boden an, Frankfurt am Main 1994
- Irgendwie das Meer, Frankfurt am Main 1995
- Der langsame Tanz, Frankfurt am Main 1998
- Andrea und Marie, München 2001
- Das Aquarium, Frankfurt am Main 2002
- Die gefährliche Frau, München 2004
- Singvogel, München 2005
- Eine kurze Geschichte vom Glück, München 2007
- Aprilwetter, München 2009
- Fallers große Liebe, München 2010
- Heimweh nach dem Ort, an dem ich bin, München 2011

== See also ==
- List of German painters
