= List of cities in Baden-Württemberg by population =

The following list sorts all cities and municipalities in the German state of Baden-Württemberg with a population of more than 25,000. As of May 15, 2022, 74 cities and municipalities meet this criterion and are included on this list. This list refers only to the population of individual municipalities within their defined limits, which does not include other municipalities or Suburban areas within urban agglomerations.

== List ==
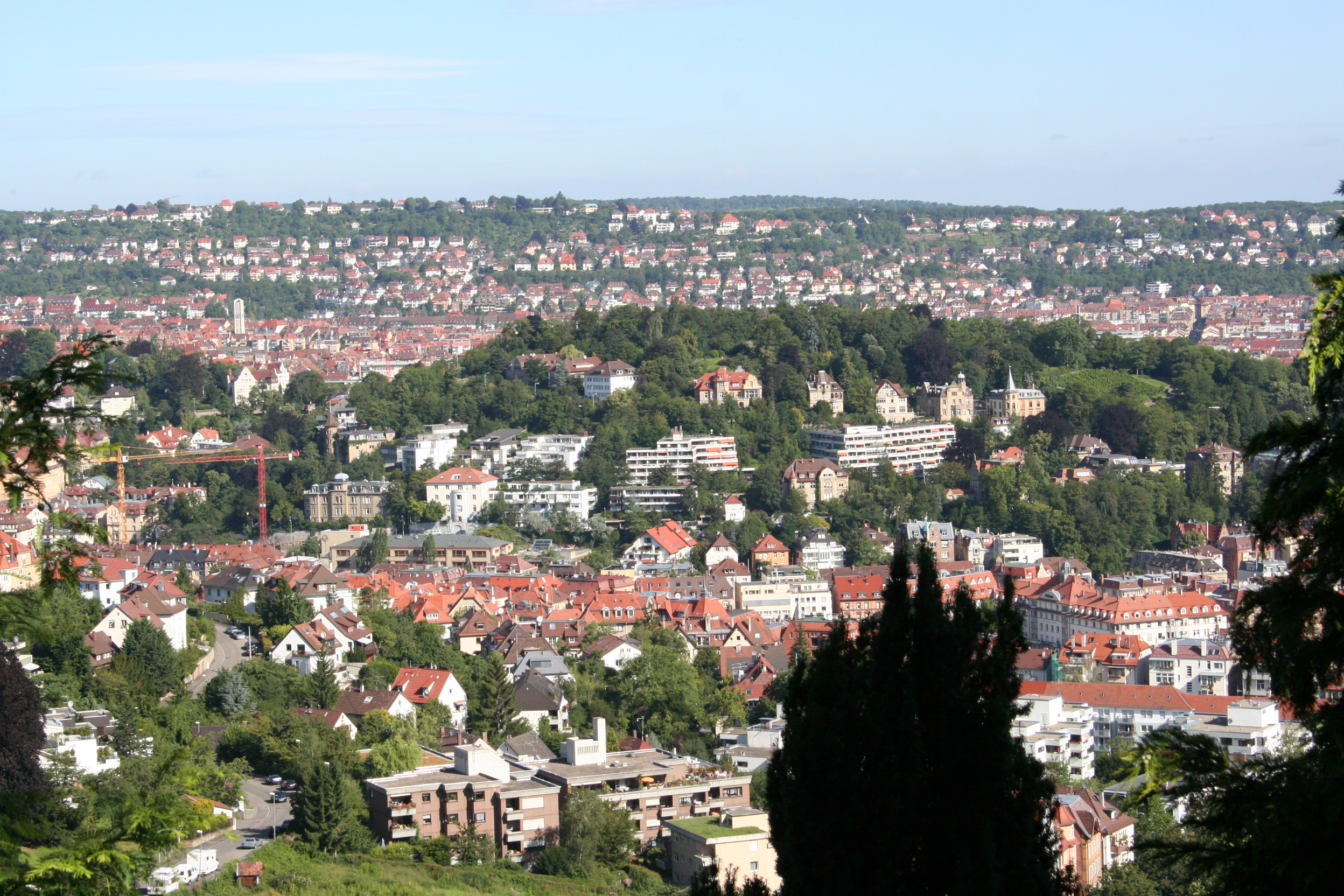
Stuttgart

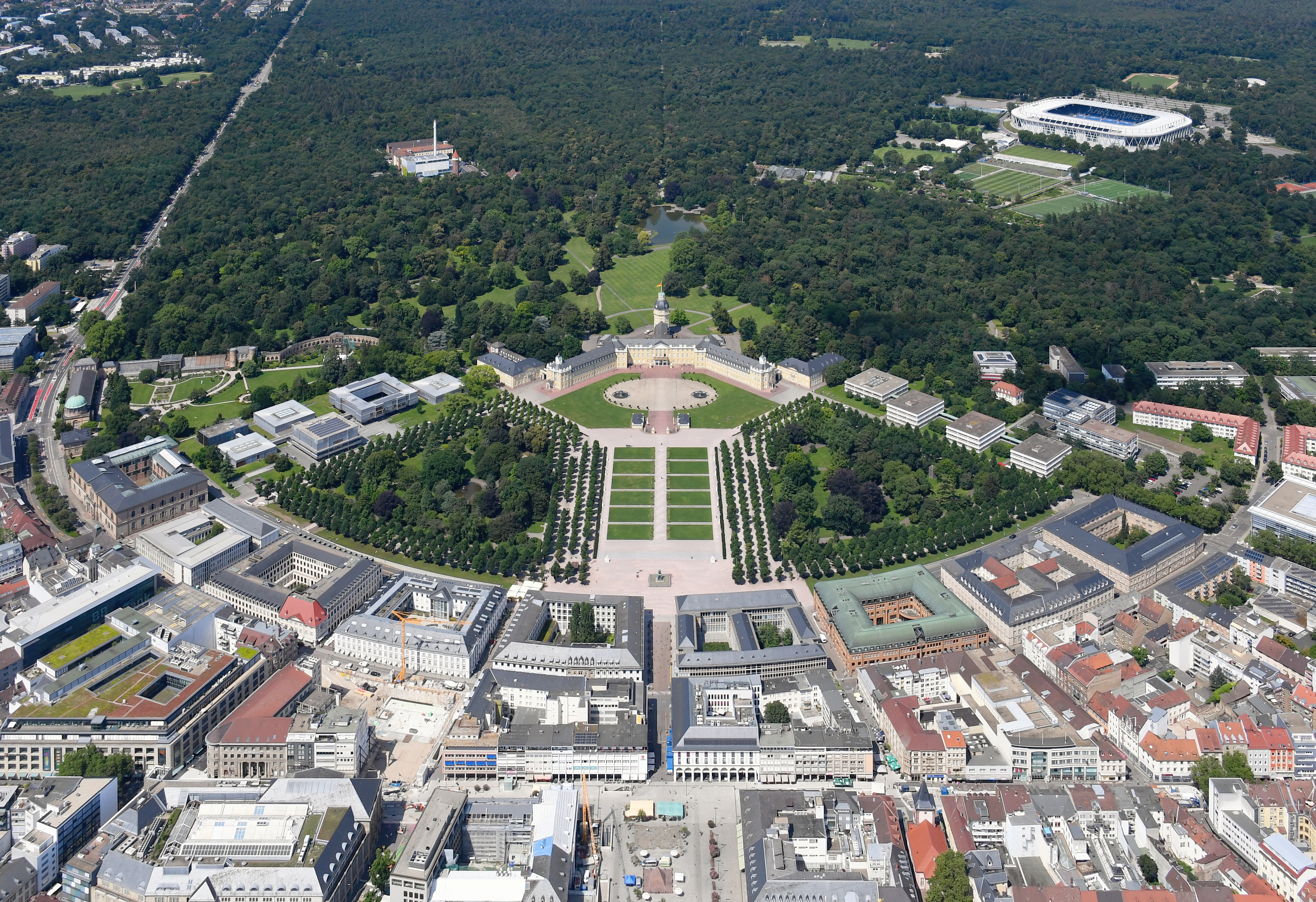
Karlsruhe

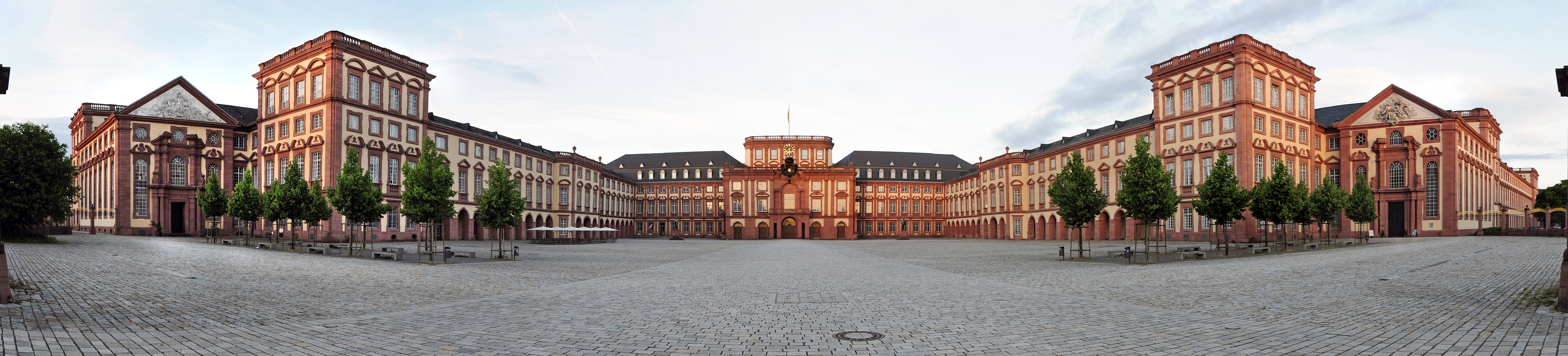
Mannheim

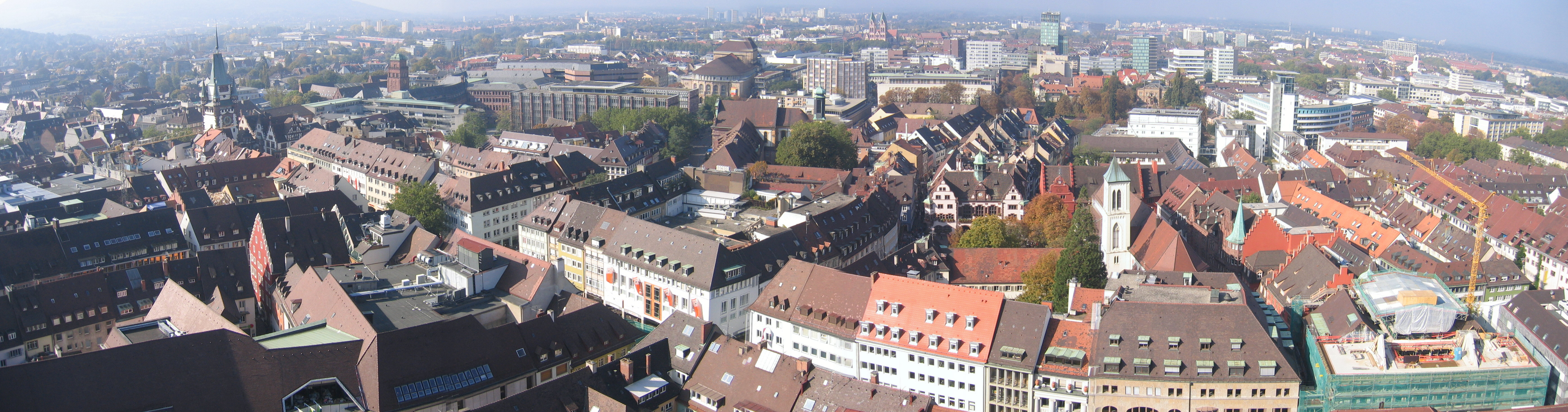
Freiburg im Breisgau

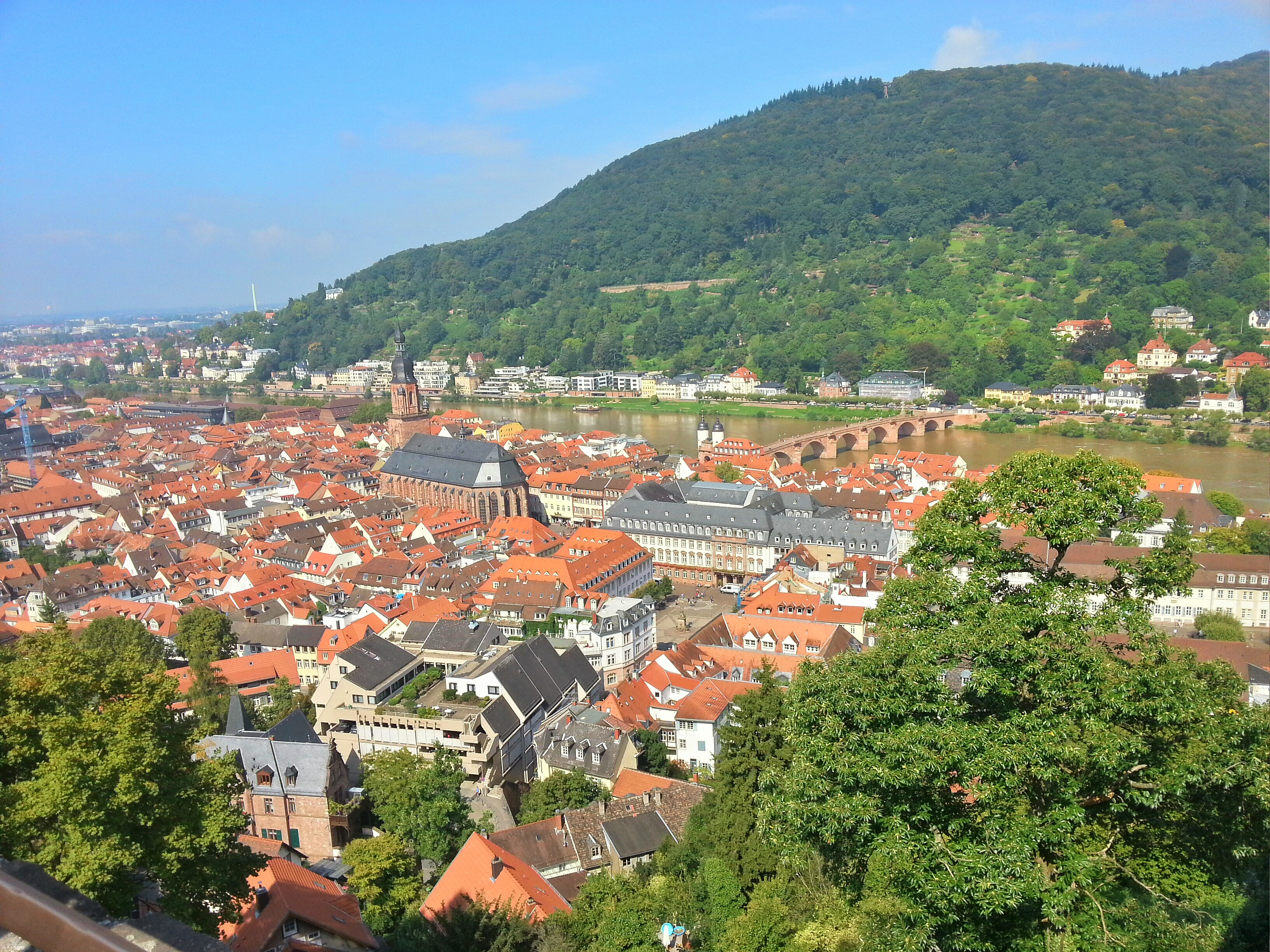
Heidelberg

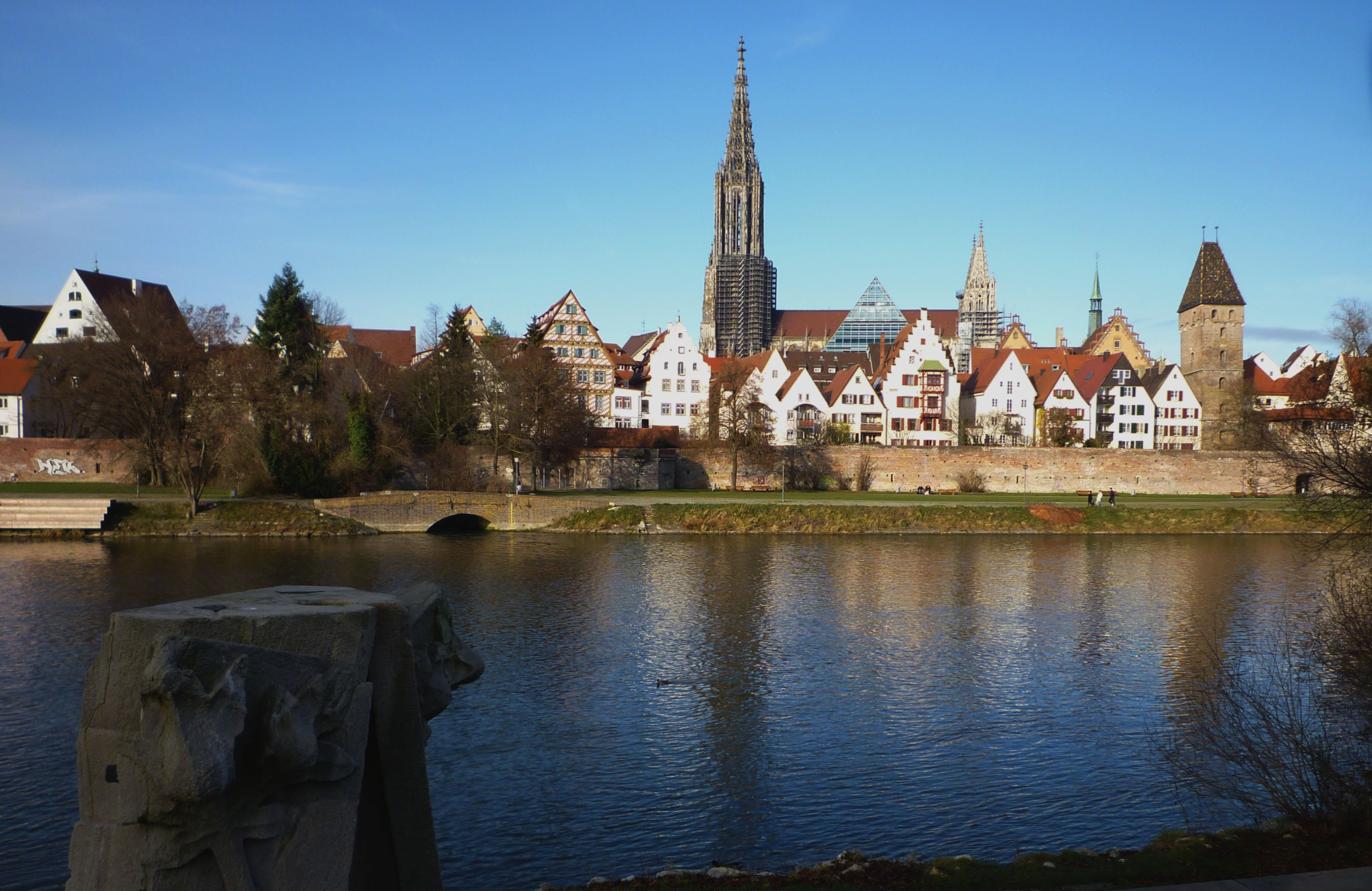
Ulm

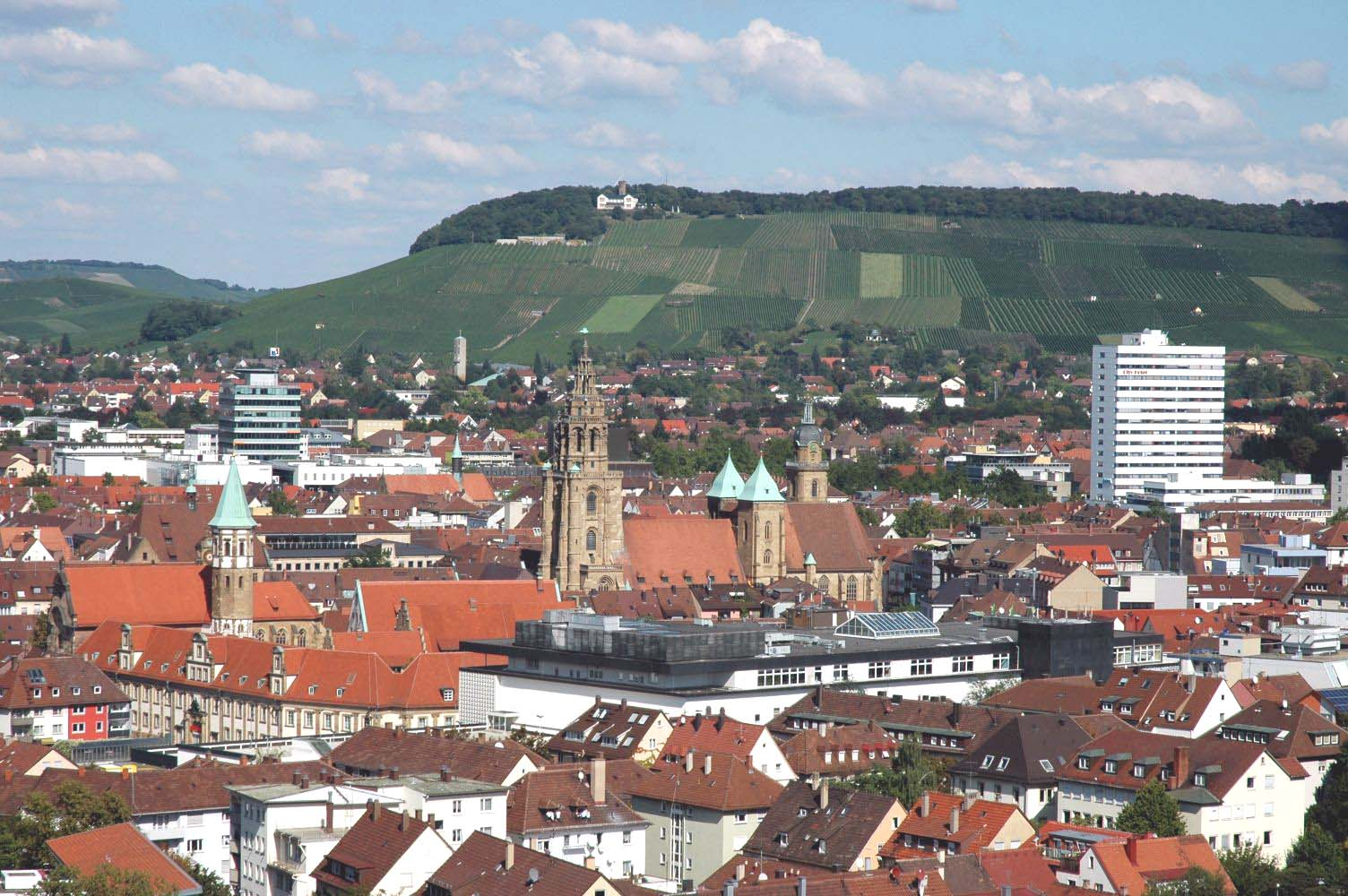
Heilbronn

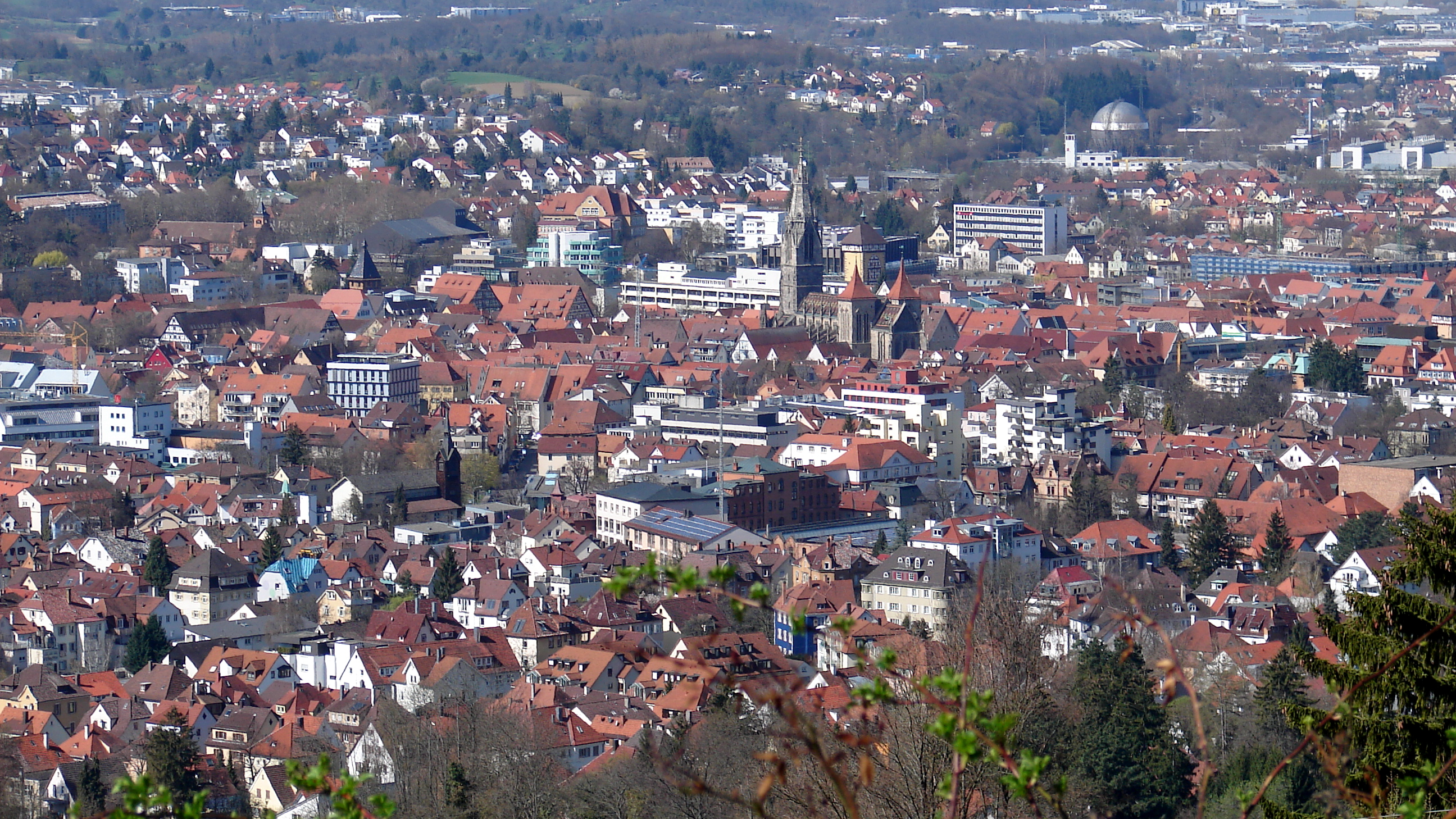
Reutlingen

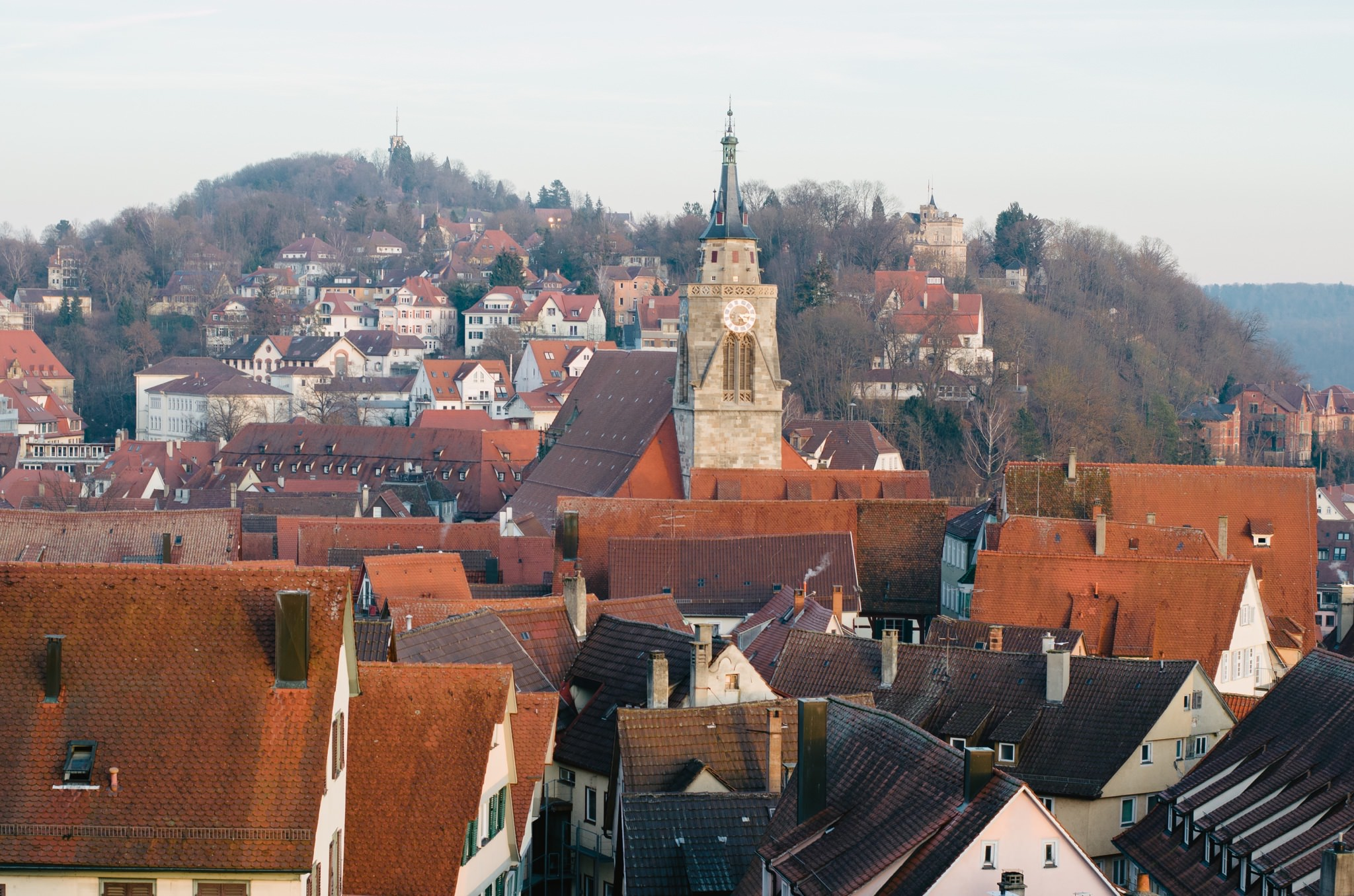
Tübingen

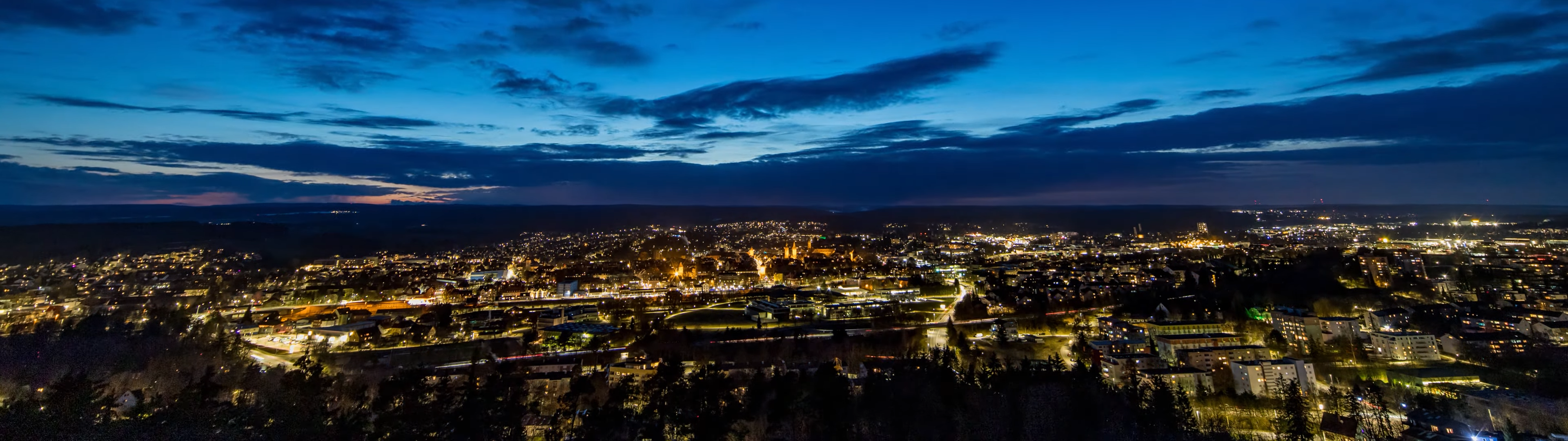
Villingen-Schwenningen

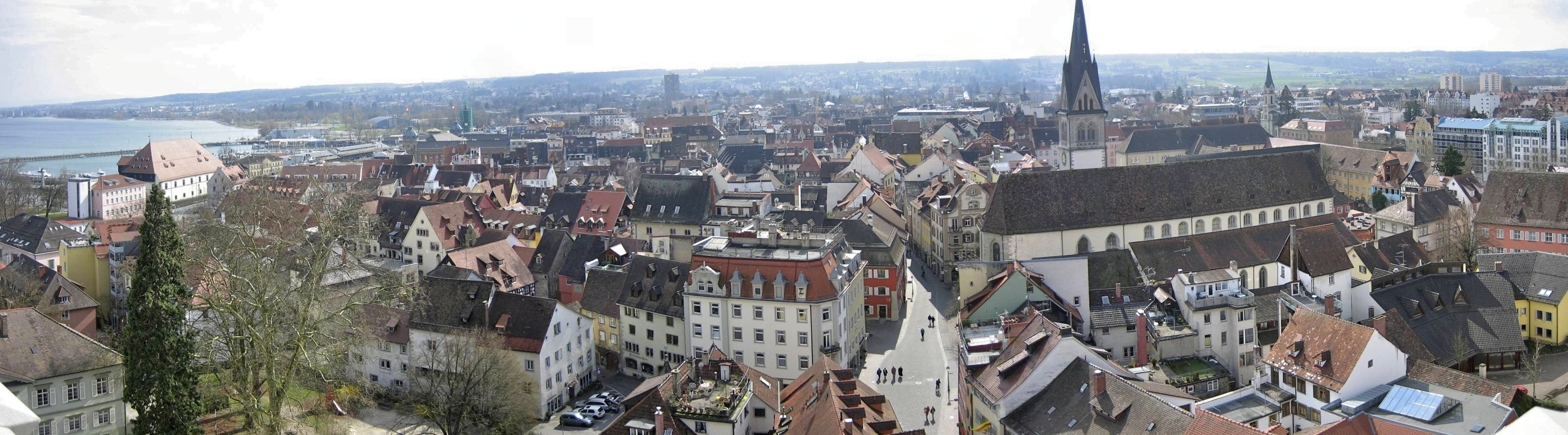
Konstanz

The following table lists the 74 cities in Baden-Württemberg with a population of at least 25,000 on May 15, 2022, as estimated by the Federal Statistical Office of Germany. A city is displayed in bold if it is a state or federal capital.

1. The city rank by population as of May 15, 2022, as enumerated by the 2022 German Census
2. The city name
3. The name of the district (Landkreis) in which the city lies (some cities are districts on their own called Stadtkreise: urban districts)
4. The city population as of May 15, 2022, as enumerated by the 2022 German Census
5. The city population as of May 9, 2011, as enumerated by the 2011 European Union census
6. The city land area as of May 15, 2022
7. The city population density as of May 15, 2022 (residents per unit of land area)

2022 rank	City	District	2022 census	2011 census	2022 land area	2022 pop. density
1	**Stuttgart**	urban district	610,458	585,890	207 km^{2}	2,944/km^{2}
2	Mannheim	urban district	313,693	290,117	145 km^{2}	2,164/km^{2}
3	Karlsruhe	urban district	305,408	289,173	173 km^{2}	1,761/km^{2}
4	Freiburg im Breisgau	urban district	233,040	209,628	153 km^{2}	1,523/km^{2}
5	Heidelberg	urban district	153,809	146,751	109 km^{2}	1,413/km^{2}
6	Pforzheim	urban district	133,110	114,411	98.1 km^{2}	1,358/km^{2}
7	Heilbronn	urban district	128,303	116,059	99.9 km^{2}	1,284/km^{2}
8	Ulm	urban district	127,116	116,761	119 km^{2}	1,071/km^{2}
9	Reutlingen	Reutlingen	116,925	109,799	87.0 km^{2}	1,343/km^{2}
10	Esslingen am Neckar	Esslingen	94,442	86,885	46.4 km^{2}	2,034/km^{2}
11	Ludwigsburg	Ludwigsburg	91,810	86,139	43.3 km^{2}	2,118/km^{2}
12	Tübingen	Tübingen	90,499	82,511	108 km^{2}	837.5/km^{2}
13	Villingen-Schwenningen	Schwarzwald-Baar-Kreis	87,478	80,123	166 km^{2}	528.5/km^{2}
14	Konstanz	Konstanz	86,437	77,796	54.1 km^{2}	1,597/km^{2}
15	Aalen	Ostalbkreis	67,139	66,318	147 km^{2}	458.0/km^{2}
16	Schwäbisch Gmünd	Ostalbkreis	63,449	58,105	114 km^{2}	557.5/km^{2}
17	Offenburg	Ortenaukreis	62,220	57,228	78.4 km^{2}	793.9/km^{2}
18	Friedrichshafen	Bodenseekreis	61,780	56,937	69.9 km^{2}	883.5/km^{2}
19	Sindelfingen	Böblingen	60,545	60,534	50.8 km^{2}	1,191/km^{2}
20	Göppingen	Göppingen	57,809	55,037	59.2 km^{2}	976.3/km^{2}
21	Waiblingen	Rems-Murr-Kreis	57,280	51,552	42.8 km^{2}	1,340/km^{2}
22	Baden-Baden	urban district	55,887	52,314	140 km^{2}	398.7/km^{2}
23	Böblingen	Böblingen	50,705	44,859	39.0 km^{2}	1,299/km^{2}
24	Rastatt	Rastatt	50,546	46,648	59.0 km^{2}	857.0/km^{2}
25	Heidenheim an der Brenz	Heidenheim	49,964	46,085	107 km^{2}	466.6/km^{2}
26	Ravensburg	Ravensburg	49,896	48,393	92.0 km^{2}	542.1/km^{2}
27	Lörrach	Lörrach	49,541	47,602	39.4 km^{2}	1,258/km^{2}
28	Lahr/Schwarzwald	Ortenaukreis	49,103	42,517	69.8 km^{2}	703.1/km^{2}
29	Leonberg	Böblingen	48,337	44,630	48.7 km^{2}	991.9/km^{2}
30	Singen (Hohentwiel)	Konstanz	46,789	44,624	61.8 km^{2}	757.5/km^{2}
31	Bruchsal	Karlsruhe	46,780	42,124	93.2 km^{2}	502.8/km^{2}
32	Fellbach	Rems-Murr-Kreis	46,147	43,612	27.7 km^{2}	1,665/km^{2}
33	Albstadt	Zollernalbkreis	46,134	44,378	134 km^{2}	343.3/km^{2}
34	Weinheim	Rhein-Neckar-Kreis	45,823	42,924	58.1 km^{2}	788.6/km^{2}
35	Filderstadt	Esslingen	45,821	43,811	38.5 km^{2}	1,189/km^{2}
36	Rottenburg am Neckar	Tübingen	44,954	40,881	142 km^{2}	316.0/km^{2}
37	Bietigheim-Bissingen	Ludwigsburg	43,328	41,539	31.3 km^{2}	1,385/km^{2}
38	Kirchheim unter Teck	Esslingen	41,676	38,802	40.5 km^{2}	1,030/km^{2}
39	Schwäbisch Hall	Schwäbisch Hall	41,247	36,548	104 km^{2}	395.9/km^{2}
40	Leinfelden-Echterdingen	Esslingen	40,774	36,445	29.9 km^{2}	1,364/km^{2}
41	Schorndorf	Rems-Murr-Kreis	40,548	38,316	56.8 km^{2}	713.5/km^{2}
42	Nürtingen	Esslingen	40,212	39,201	46.9 km^{2}	857.8/km^{2}
43	Ostfildern	Esslingen	39,555	35,806	22.8 km^{2}	1,734/km^{2}
44	Kehl	Ortenaukreis	38,556	33,551	75.1 km^{2}	513.6/km^{2}
45	Ettlingen	Karlsruhe	38,461	38,650	56.8 km^{2}	677.7/km^{2}
46	Backnang	Rems-Murr-Kreis	38,202	34,250	39.4 km^{2}	970.1/km^{2}
47	Tuttlingen	Tuttlingen	36,665	33,214	90.5 km^{2}	405.4/km^{2}
48	Sinsheim	Rhein-Neckar-Kreis	36,517	34,589	127 km^{2}	287.6/km^{2}
49	Balingen	Zollernalbkreis	35,190	33,318	90.3 km^{2}	389.6/km^{2}
50	Rheinfelden (Baden)	Lörrach	34,438	31,723	62.8 km^{2}	548.0/km^{2}
51	Crailsheim	Schwäbisch Hall	34,395	32,303	109 km^{2}	315.3/km^{2}
52	Biberach an der Riss	Biberach	34,018	30,906	72.2 km^{2}	471.5/km^{2}
53	Kornwestheim	Ludwigsburg	33,536	30,901	14.7 km^{2}	2,289/km^{2}
54	Herrenberg	Böblingen	33,344	29,939	65.7 km^{2}	507.5/km^{2}
55	Weil am Rhein	Lörrach	31,476	28,828	19.5 km^{2}	1,617/km^{2}
56	Radolfzell am Bodensee	Konstanz	30,742	29,571	58.5 km^{2}	525.1/km^{2}
57	Bretten	Karlsruhe	29,871	27,509	71.1 km^{2}	420.1/km^{2}
58	Gaggenau	Rastatt	29,553	28,655	65.0 km^{2}	454.6/km^{2}
59	Winnenden	Rems-Murr-Kreis	29,297	27,039	28.1 km^{2}	1,044/km^{2}
60	Emmendingen	Emmendingen	29,137	25,868	33.8 km^{2}	862.6/km^{2}
61	Bühl	Rastatt	28,782	28,439	73.2 km^{2}	393.3/km^{2}
62	Vaihingen an der Enz	Ludwigsburg	28,576	27,891	73.4 km^{2}	389.3/km^{2}
63	Wangen im Allgäu	Ravensburg	27,553	26,169	101 km^{2}	271.9/km^{2}
64	Ehingen	Alb-Donau-Kreis	27,241	24,453	178 km^{2}	152.8/km^{2}
65	Wiesloch	Rhein-Neckar-Kreis	27,095	24,735	30.2 km^{2}	896.0/km^{2}
66	Geislingen an der Steige	Göppingen	26,869	26,085	75.8 km^{2}	354.3/km^{2}
67	Leimen	Rhein-Neckar-Kreis	26,852	25,339	20.6 km^{2}	1,301/km^{2}
68	Weinstadt	Rems-Murr-Kreis	26,807	25,957	31.7 km^{2}	845.4/km^{2}
69	Mühlacker	Enzkreis	26,420	24,689	54.3 km^{2}	486.4/km^{2}
70	Neckarsulm	Heilbronn	26,221	25,445	24.9 km^{2}	1,051/km^{2}
71	Remseck am Neckar	Ludwigsburg	26,024	23,177	22.8 km^{2}	1,140/km^{2}
72	Achern	Ortenaukreis	25,696	24,523	65.2 km^{2}	393.9/km^{2}
73	Horb am Neckar	Freudenstadt	25,424	24,800	119.8 km^{2}	212.3/km^{2}
74	Öhringen	Hohenlohekreis	25,320	22,498	67.8 km^{2}	373.5/km^{2}
