= Henriette Ottenheimer =

German Jewish poet (1807–1883)

- Born: 10 September 1807; Stuttgart, Württemberg, Confederation of the Rhine
- Died: March 1883 (aged 75); Stuttgart, Württemberg, German Empire
- Writing career
- Language: German

Henriette Ottenheimer (10 September 1807 – late March 1883) was a German Jewish poet.

She was born to Jewish parents Jakob and Sara Ottenheimer in Stuttgart, Württemberg, and became partially paralysed at the age of six. She was particularly interested in Jewish history from an early age, and so she made it her life's work to contribute to the fight against anti-Semitism with her poetry.

She numbered among her friends and correspondents many famous personages, including Ludwig Uhland, Friedrich Rückert, Michael Beer, Gabriel Rießer, Wolfgang Menzel, and others. In the 1870s she became completely paralyzed, and lived with an aged sister near Ratisbon.

Henriette Ottenheimer wrote much, both in prose and in poetry, although she published little. Her most important work is the poem "Der Kettenschmied, ein Märchentraum" (Stuttgart, 1835), dedicated to Uhland. Other works include: Gedichte (Stuttgart, 1832), a volume of poems; Bilder und Lieder (Munich, 1833); Erzählungen und Gedichte (Stuttgart, 1836); and Erzählungen (Leipzig, 1841). She also contributed stories and lyric poems to the Morgenblatt, August Lewald's Europa, Eduard Duller's Phönix and Deutsches Stammbuch, Karl Spindler's Damenzeitung, and other periodicals.
