= Johann Eberhard Ihle =

German painter

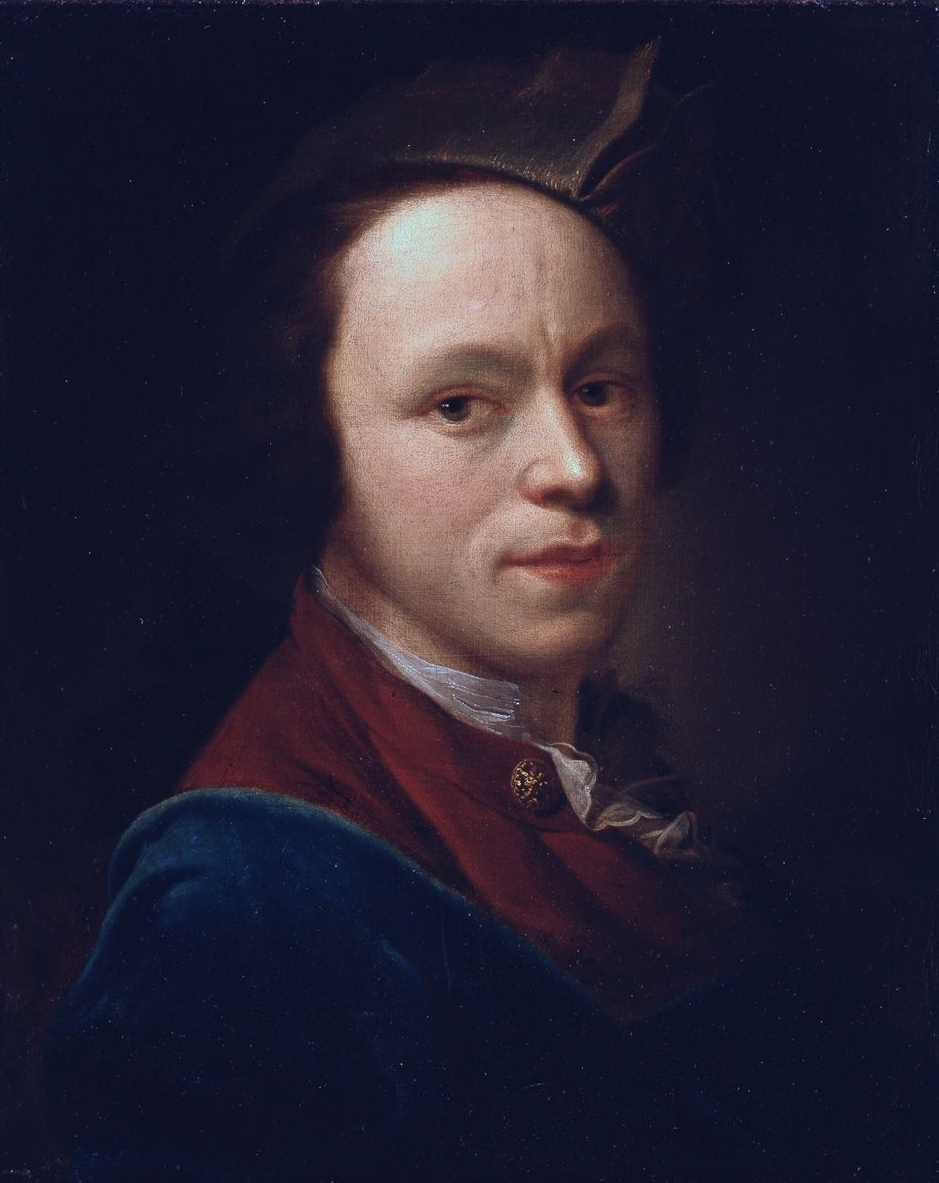
- Self-portrait (1754)
- Born: June 5, 1727; Esslingen, Germany
- Died: January 17, 1814 (aged 86); Nuremberg, Germany
- Known for: Painting
- Style: Rococo; Classicism

Johann Eberhard Ihle (5 June 1727, in Esslingen – 17 January 1814, in Nuremberg) was a German painter.

He was the son of portraitist Johann Jakob Ihle (1702–1774), from whom he first learned painting. In 1749 he settled in Nuremberg, where in 1751 he became a member of the Nürnberger Malerakademie. From 1771 to 1811 he served as director of the Academy.

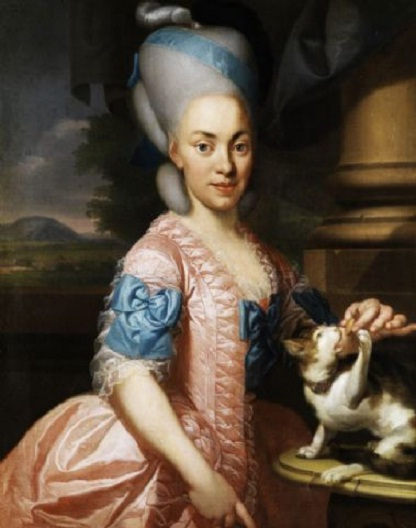
Portrait eines Nürnberger Edelfräuleins by Ihle

His painting style ranged from Rococo to Classicism. He is considered one of the more significant Nuremberg portrait painters of the second half of the 18th century.
