= Karl Deffner =

German manufacturer, politician and geologist

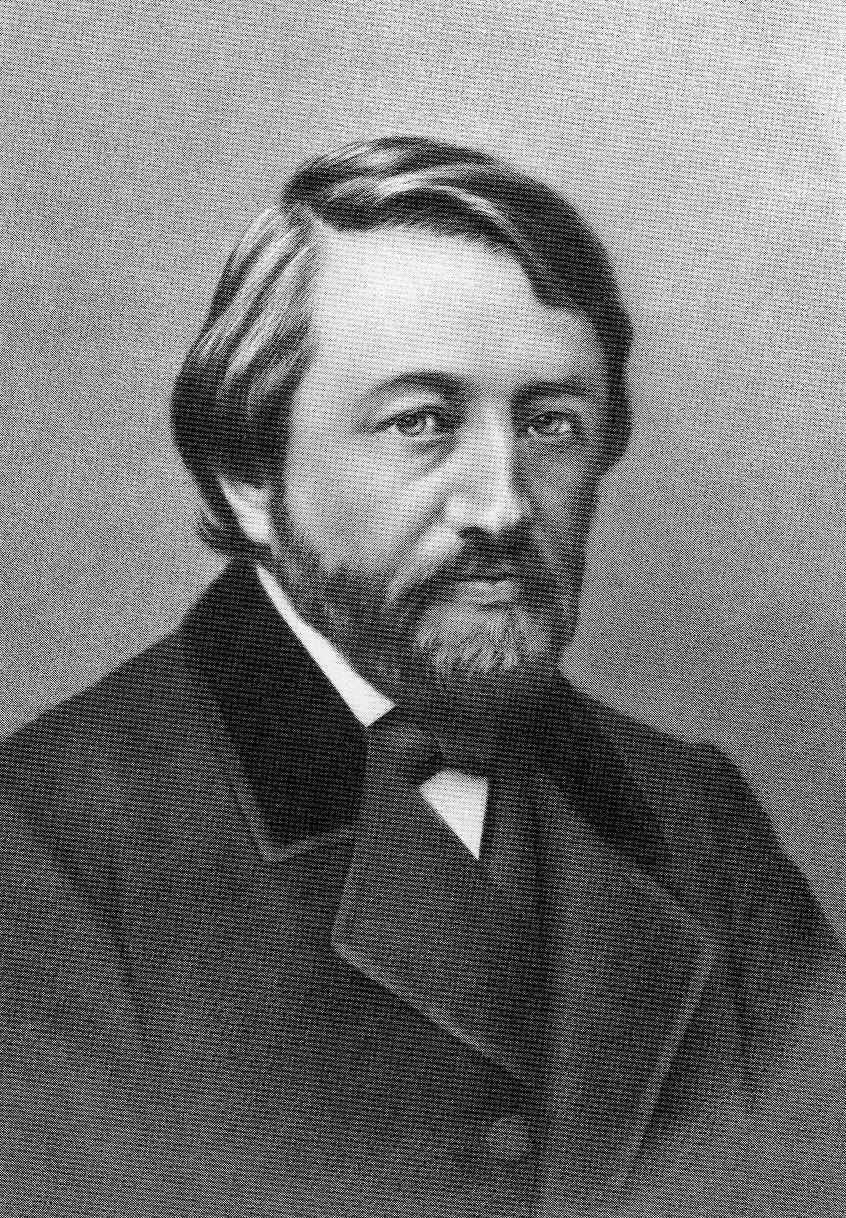
Karl Ludwig Deffner (ca. 1870)

Karl Ludwig Deffner (8 February 1817 in Esslingen am Neckar – 11 June 1877 in Esslingen am Neckar) was a German manufacturer, politician and geologist. He was the son of manufacturer and politician, Carl Christian Ulrich Deffner (1789–1846).

== Biography ==
He received his education at polytechnic schools in Stuttgart and Berlin. In 1846, following the death of his father, he took over management of a metal goods factory. In the 1850s he gradually handed over the company's business to his younger brother, Wilhelm Deffner (1829–1897).

He is known for his geological investigations of Württemberg, in particular, exploratory studies of the Nördlinger Ries crater and the Filder Graben (located near Filderstadt). He also made significant contributions towards publication of the geological map of Württemberg. Shortly before his death, he donated his paleontological, mineralogical and geological collections to the Oberrealschule in Esslingen.

Between 1855 & 1870 he was a member of the Württemberg Landtag (Liberal Party), and between 1868 & 1870 was part of the Zollparlament.

== Selected published works ==
- Die Jura-Versenkung bei Langenbrücken: Geognostische Monographie, (with Oscar Fraas) 1859.
- Der Buchberg bei Bopfingen, 1870.
- Begleitworte zur geognostischen Specialkarte von Württemberg: Atlasblätter Bopfingen und Ellenberg, (with Oscar Fraas) 1877.
- Geognostische Karte von Württemberg, (with Oscar Fraas and Jakob Hildenbrand).
