= Ebersmunster Abbey =

Abbey in Bas-Rhin, France

Coordinates: 48°18′40″N 7°31′37″E

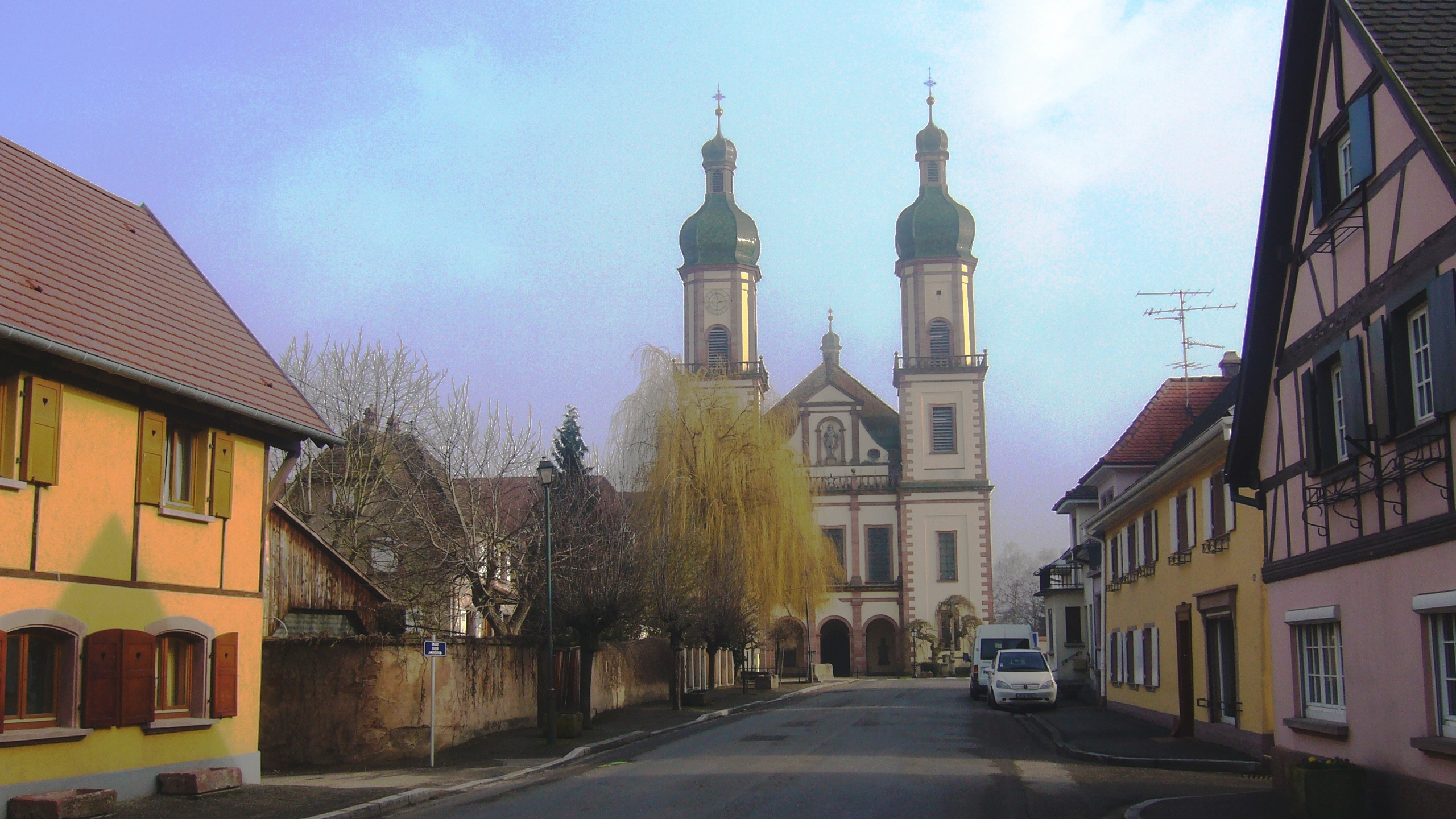
Abbey church of St Maurice, Ebersmunster

Ebersmunster Abbey (French: Abbaye d'Ebersmunster; German: Kloster Ebersmünster) was a Benedictine abbey in Ebersmunster in Alsace, Bas-Rhin, France. The Baroque abbey church of St Maurice survives.

== Foundation ==
The abbey, dedicated to Saint Maurice, was founded in 667 by Saint Deodatus of Nevers on the island of Novientum in the River Ill, using relics of Saint Maurice which Deodatus had obtained from St. Maurice's Abbey.

Thanks to the support of Adalrich, Duke of Alsace, father of Saint Odilia, the monastery flourished.

It was destroyed by the Swedes during the Thirty Years' War, and was not rebuilt until the early 18th century. Much of the Baroque abbey church, now prominent in its own right as a World Heritage Site, was built by the Austrian architect Peter Thumb. The abbey was dissolved during the French Revolution and the conventual buildings were demolished. The contents of the library were taken to Strasbourg, where most of them were burnt in the market place.

The site was reoccupied in 1829 by a community of Marianist Brothers and Priests, and from 1887 by the Sisters of St Joseph of Saint-Marc.

== Sources ==
- Lehni, Roger, 1986: Die Abteikirche von Ebersmünster. Drancy: Éditions Mage
- Ohresser, Canon (1961): Eglise et abbaye d'Ebersmunster. Imprimerie Alsatia
