= Andreas Silbermann =

German organ builder (1678–1734)

Andreas Silbermann (16 May 1678 – 16 March 1734) was a German organ builder, who was involved in the construction of 35 organs, mostly in Alsace. Andreas also established the Silbermann family tradition of organ building, training his brother Gottfried and his son Johann Andreas in the profession.

== Biography ==
Silbermann was born on 16 May 1678 in Kleinbobritzsch, near Frauenstein, Electorate of Saxony, the son of a joiner. He himself trained as a joiner in Freiberg under George Lampertius, but soon afterwards learnt the art of organ building, moving to Alsace in 1699. The exact timing and source of his training is unknown, with proposed names of his mentor including Friederich Ring and Daniel Übermann. During his early work in Alsace, Silbermann carried out renovation work on the organ constructed by Johann-Jacob Baldner in the church of St Léger in Bouxwiller.

After this, he moved to work with Strasbourg organ builder Friderich Ring, settling permanently in the city in 1701 and receiving citizenship on 15 March 1702. By this time, Andreas had trained his brother Gottfried, and they built an organ together. Between 1704 and 1706, Silbermann moved to Paris, where he worked with François Thierry, having a particular concern to develop his understanding in the French style. He then returned to Strasbourg, where he worked with his brother on a few more projects, namely the Collegium Wilhelmitanum (1706) and the church of St Nicolas (1707).

In 1708, Andreas began working alone as his brother Gottfried had returned to Saxony. In the following years, Silbermann was involved in several major commissions, including constructing an organ at Strasbourg Cathedral (1714–1716), which was the largest organ he built during his career.

In 1712, his son Johann Andreas was born. Trained under his father, Johann collaborated with Andreas during the final years of his life and continued the family business after his death.

Silbermann died on 16 March 1734 in Strasbourg.

== Style ==
Silbermann's organs were built mostly in a French style.

== Organs built by Silbermann ==
- 1706 – Collegium Wilhelmitanum
- 1707 – Saint Nicholas Church, Strasbourg
- 1709–10 – Marmoutier Abbey church, Alsace
- 1711 – Basle Cathedral
- 1714–16 – Strasbourg Cathedral
- 1718 – Saint Aurelia's Church, Strasbourg
- 1721 – Église Saints Simon et Jude, Ottrott
- 1726 – Dominican Church, Colmar
- 1729–30 – St Cyriaque, Altorf
- 1732 – Church of Saint Maurice, Ebersmunster, Alsace
- 1732 – Église Saint-Matthieu, Colmar
- 1733 – Rosheim
