= Günterstal Abbey =

Coordinates: 47°57′59″N 7°51′39″E

- Kloster Günterstal
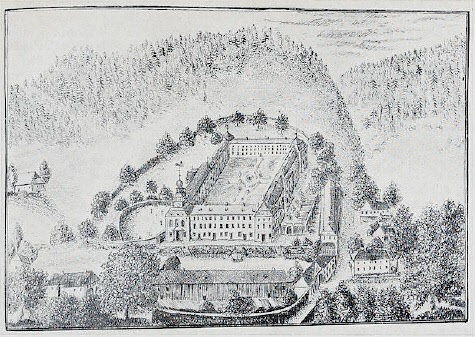
- Günterstal Abbey c. 1781.

Religion
- Affiliation: Roman Catholicism
- Ecclesiastical or organizational status: Defunct

Location
- Municipality: Freiburg im Breisgau
- Country: Germany
- Interactive map of Günterstal Abbey

Architecture
- Groundbreaking: 1221
- Completed: 1806

Günterstal Abbey, earlier also Güntersthal Abbey (German: Kloster Günterstal or Güntersthal), was a Cistercian nunnery that existed from 1221 to 1806 located in Günterstal, which today is a district in Freiburg im Breisgau, Germany.

== History ==
The first documented reference to Günterstal Abbey is dated 15 September 1224, when Konrad von Tegerfelden, Bishop of Constance, inaugurated a new altar in the chapel of the as yet unfinished nunnery. In later writings, the abbey gives its year of foundation as 1221. A nobleman of the nearby Burg Kybfelsen is said to have founded the abbey for his daughters Adelheid and Berta, who were joined by other women seeking to live in a monastic community. Early on the new foundation came into contact with Tennenbach Abbey, a Cistercian monastery. It is presumed that Günterstal's admission to the Cistercian Order took place soon after 1224. The abbot of Tennenbach was ex officio also the supervising abbot (German: Weisungsabt; Latin: pater immediatus) of Günterstal until circa 1380. As such, he oversaw its administration, conducted visitations, and was responsible for the appointment of the abbess and her inauguration.

In 1233, Pope Gregory IX confirmed the possessions of the nunnery. In 1238 the community moved to Oberried, only to be relocated back to Günterstal six years later. In 1246, Pope Innocent IV confirmed its possessions again, which had grown in the meantime through gifts and donations. Among the most important gifts was the Günterstaler Dinghof (a farm) which St Peter's Abbey had exchanged for a farm in Scherzingen. A property register from 1344 shows that the nunnery owned property in up to 90 locations including an estate in Mundenhof which is now the animal sanctuary and park. At this time the village of Günterstal consisted of twenty-five houses. The nobility of the region, such as the Küchlin, Geben and Schnewlin families, made frequent gifts to the abbey: their unmarried daughters who wanted to enter it had to give all of their possessions to it, unlike a Damenstift (community of secular canonesses). The abbesses sat in the Landstände of Further Austria. The abbey chose its Vögte from the local nobility which supported it (for example, the families of Schnewlin, Falkenstein and Blumegg).

The residents of the abbey consisted on the one hand of the nuns, from the nobility, and on the other, lay sisters and servants. The chaplain and the confessor were provided by Tennenbach Abbey. The nunnery was also involved in reclaiming land by clearing forests. As early as 1278 the need for bigger premises became apparent. In 1279 the first abbess, Adelheid (d. 1281), resigned from her position.

In 1486 the abbey was damaged by a flood. In times of war it was plundered several times. During the Peasants' War in May 1525, Abbess Agnes von Tusslingen fled to Freiburg where she later died. The abbey was plundered by the peasants and later claimed compensation of 2,218 gulden. In 1632, the nuns escaped the Swedish army by the skin of their teeth by fleeing to Rheinau Abbey.

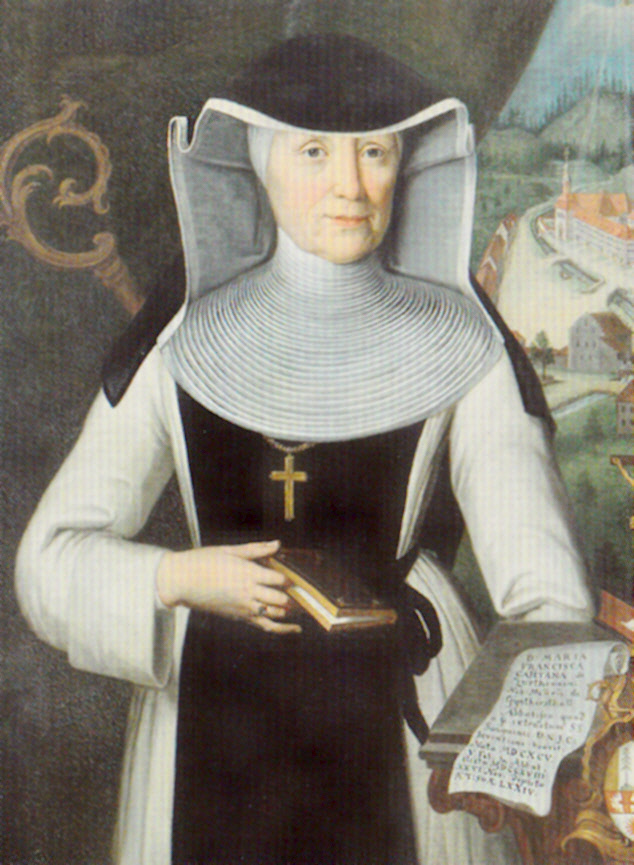
Abbess Maria Franziska Cajetana von Zurthannen

In 1674, under Abbess Agnes von Greuth, the abbey released its serfs from their serfdom. After improvement in the abbey's financial situation it was decided in 1727, under Abbess Maria Rosa von Neveu, to replace the old conventual building with a new one. Between 1728 and 1748, under Abbess Maria Franziska Cajetanna von Zurthannen, completely new Baroque premises were constructed according to designs by Peter Thumb.

=== Secularisation ===
The abbey survived the Josephine reforms of the 1780s. On 30 January 1806, the Electorate of Baden declared that all monasteries, nunneries and other religious communities in the Breisgau were abolished and on 3 February Günterstal Abbey was formally seized. The abbess and nuns received pensions from the state and left the abbey before October 25. The last survivor of the community died in 1843.

== The abbess ==
The last abbess was Maria Francisca von Thurn und Valsassina, in office from 1770 to 1806.

| Name | Dates of birth and death | Terms of office | Notes |
|---|---|---|---|
| Adelheid (von Horben ?) | (died 1281) | 1224 - 1279 |
| Adelheidis | | occurs 1285 |
| Heintrudis von Müllheim | | 1287 - 1291 | 1293 - an altar was consecrated [in her memory?] |
| Gutun | | occurs 1292 |
| Anna Lapp | | occurs 1297 |
| Adelheid von Munzingen | | occurs 1305 |
| Anna Lapp | | 1311 - 1324 | second term |
| Agnes Tegenhard | | occurs 1325 |
| Elisabeth von Schlettstadt | | occurs 1329/1330 |
| Katharina Schwab | | occurs 1333 |
| Mechthild Opfinger | | 1334 - 1348 |
| Katharina Morser | | 1357 - 1359 |
| Mechthild Opfinger | | 1360 - 1366 | second term |
| Katharina Morser | (died 1373) | 1366 - 1373 |
| Elisabeth | | 1376 - 1388 | caused the abbot of Tennenbach to lose his supervisory function |
| Anna Meiger | (died 1418) | 1401 - 1412 |
| Klara von Hornberg | (died 1418) | 1401 - 1412 |
| Margarethe Brenner | | 1431 - 1464 | in this period the abbey was excommunicated; the excommunication was lifted in 1435 |
| Verena Tegelin von Wangen | (died 1490) | 1457 - 1480 |
| Mechthild von Falkenstein | (died 1482) | 1480 - 1482 |
| Agnes von Tusslingen | | 1482 - 1504 | in 1482 the abbey comprised 29 sisters and 3 lay sisters. |
| Veronica von Müllheim | (died 1508) | 1504 - 1508 |
| Agnes von Tusslingen | (died 1525) | 1508 - 1525 | second term; during the Peasants' War she fled to Freiburg, where she died and was buried. |
| Kunigund Roeder von Diersburg | (died 1530) | 1525 - 1530 |
| Maria Schnewlin von Bollschweil | | 1530 - 1534 |
| Verena Tegelin von Wangen II | (died 1551) | 1534 - 1540 | resigned after dispute with the nuns |
| Maria von Roggenbach | | occurs in 1540 |
| Maria Agnes von Greuth | (died 1694) | 1669 - 1694 | the abbey had a complement of 14 nuns, 2 novices and 5 lay sisters |
| Maria Francisca von Grammont | (1668 - 1716) | 1696 - 1716 |
| Maria Rosa von Neveu | (died 1728) | 1716 - 1728 | authorised the building of a new church in 1728 under master-builder Peter Thumb |
| Maria Francisca Cajetana von Zurthannen | (1695 - 1770) | 1728 - 1770 | ordered the construction of the Baroque conventual buildings |
| Maria Francisca von Thurn und Valsassina | (1740 - 1808) | 1770 - 1806 | in 1780, the abbey had a complement of 19 nuns and 10 lay sisters; in 1806 there were 6 nuns besides the abbess and 5 lay sisters |

== After secularisation ==
The company Friedrich Mez & Co., established on 1 June 1812, bought the principal conventual building along with the ancillary buildings and land on 5 September 1812 for 8,000 Gulden. They constructed a cotton mill, which had to be auctioned off soon after, in 1817. The new owners, Benedict and Marquard von Hermann, then hired mainly children from the ages of 12-14 to work at the mill. In the night of 3–4 April 1829, the mill was burnt almost completely to the ground, among rumours of arson, perhaps even by the owner himself. A reward was offered for any information relating to the crime.

The south and west wings of the former abbey building were completely destroyed, and the other two wings were burnt down to the first floor. These two wings were reconstructed again. However, the cotton mill was replaced by a brewery. In a neighbouring building, a weaving mill was being run. After the death of the owner in 1840, his widow sold the brewery to Gustav Schelte in 1845. The weaving mill continued to be operated by the family of von Hermann. In 1859 other shareholders were added, who led the enterprise under the company name Mechanische Baumwoll-Weberei Güntersthal until it was completely taken over by a Swiss shareholder named Gottlieb Siebenmann. The brewery had already been purchased in the name of the Catholic Orphanage Foundation in 1892 by Mathäus Jungmaier, who had constructed an orphanage there. In 1896 the foundation purchased the whole of the former conventual premises. Today they are occupied by the boarding house of the Deutsch-Französische Gymnasium of Freiburg, a kindergarten and various social facilities.

== The abbey church ==
The former abbey church, now known as the Liebfrauenkirche (the Church of Our Lady), which was also destroyed in the fire of 1829, was rebuilt by the state in 1833/34 to plans by Gottlieb Lumpp, who reused parts of the old frontage. It was renovated between 1998 and 2002, when efforts were made to keep as much as possible of the original interior design. Today, the church is used by the Catholic pastoral care organisation Freiburg Wiehre-Günterstal.

== Bibliography ==
- Josef Bader: Die Schicksale des ehemaligen Frauenstifts Güntersthal bei Freiburg i. Br. In: Freiburger Diözesan Archiv Band 5 (1870) pp. 119–206 online, UB Freiburg
- Ernst Dreher: Das Kloster Günterstal: von d. Wahl d. letzten Äbtissin (1770) bis zur Franz. Revolution (1789). In: Schau-ins-Land, Bd. 108 (1989), pp. 169–194 online, UB Freiburg
- Ernst Dreher: Die Äbtissinnen des Zisterzienserinnenklosters Günterstal. In: Freiburger Diözesan Archiv Band 120 (2000) S. 5-51 online, UB Freiburg
- Ernst Dreher: Kirche, Kloster und Kapellen in Günterstal. In: Schau-ins-Land, Bd. 106 (1987), pp. 31–68 online, UB Freiburg
- Ernst Dreher: Anmerkungen zur Gründungsgeschichte der Zisterzienserinnenklöster Wonnental und Günterstal. In: Schau-ins-Land, Bd. 110 (1991), pp. 109–118 online, UB Freiburg
- Ernst Dreher: Günterstal im Jahre 1795. In: Schau-ins-Land, Bd. 112 (1993), pp. 105–134 online, UB Freiburg
- Ernst Dreher: Die Gemeinde Günterstal zwischen 1806 und 1830, In: Schau-ins-Land, Bd. 114 (1995), pp. 135–161 online, UB Freiburg
- Ernst Dreher: Die Gemeinde Günterstal von 1806 bis 1830 (2. Teil). In: Schau-ins-Land, Bd. 116 (1997), pp. 253–281 online, UB Freiburg
- Karl Suso Frank: Kath. Pfarrkirche Liebfrauen Freiburg-Günterstal, Kunstverlag Josef Fink, Lichtenberg, 2005, ISBN 3-89870-231-6
- Franz Josef Gemmert: Die Schicksale der Textilfabriken in den säkularisierten Breisgauer Klöstern. In: Schau-ins-Land, Bd. 77 (1959), pp. 62–89, Günterstal pp. 76–82 online, UB Freiburg
- Constanze Kienast: Sei im Besitze und du wohnst im Recht. Der Günterstaler Berain von 1344: ein typischer Vertreter mittelalterlicher Güterverzeichnisse?. In: Schau-ins-Land, Bd. 112 (1993), pp. 31–48 online, UB Freiburg
- Albert Krieger, Badische Historische Kommission [ed.]: Topographisches Wörterbuch des Großherzogtums Baden, Band 1, Spalte 792-797 Heidelberg, 1904 online, UB Heidelberg
- Fritz Ziegler: Wappenskulpturen des Klosters Günterstal. In: Schau-ins-Land, Bd. 51-53 (1926), pp. 88–92 online, UB Freiburg
