= Église Saint-Martin, Marmoutier =

Église Saint-Martin de Marmoutier
- Abbatiale de Marmoutier
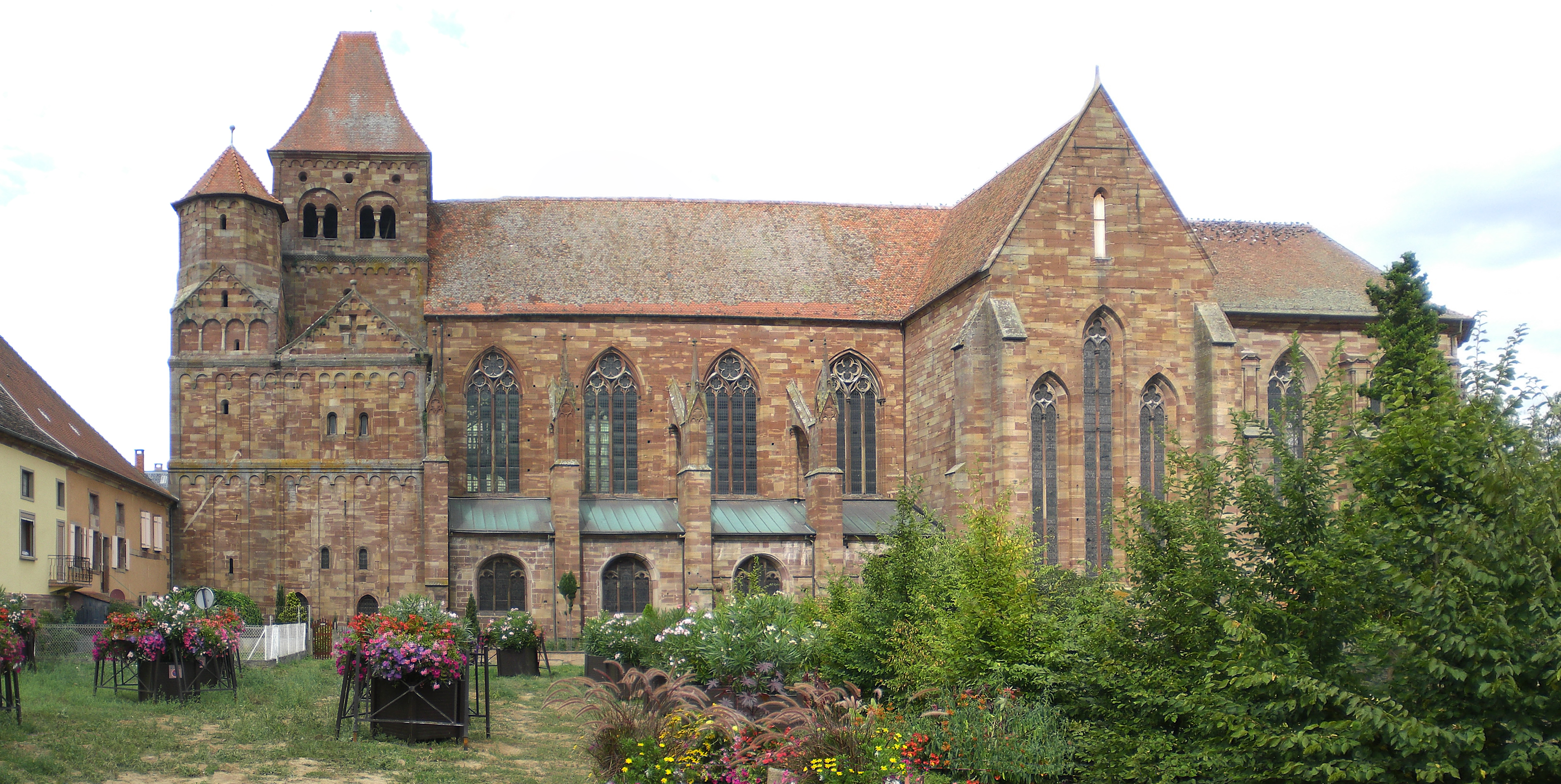
- Lateral view of the formerly abbey church
- Église Saint-Martin de Marmoutier
- 48°41′26″N 7°22′57″E
- Location: Marmoutier
- Country: France
- Denomination: Catholic

History
- Former name(s): Abteikirche Maursmünster; Abbatiale Saint-Étienne de Marmoutier
- Status: Parish church
- Founded: 6th century
- Dedication: Saint Stephen (formerly); Saint Martin (currently)

Architecture
- Heritage designation: Monument historique
- Designated: 1840
- Style: Romanesque; Gothic; Gothic Revival
- Groundbreaking: 1150
- Completed: 1770

Specifications
- Length: 74 m (243 ft)
- Materials: pink Vosges sandstone

Administration
- Archdiocese: Strasbourg
- Parish: Communauté de paroisses «Terres et eaux de Marmoutier»

Église Saint-Martin is the parish church of the small commune of Marmoutier, in the Bas-Rhin department of France. The church used to belong to Marmoutier Abbey and to be dedicated to Saint Stephen; it is still known as église (church), or abbatiale (abbey church) Saint-Étienne.

Built over a period of over 700 years, Marmoutier's church has a length of 74 metres (243 feet), and grows younger from West to East: the facade with its porch tower is Romanesque, the nave is Gothic, and the choir was rebuilt in the years 1765–1770 in an early Gothic Revival style. It is classified as a Monument historique by the French Ministry of Culture since 1840, making it a part of the very first list of such heritage buildings, and is a stage on the Romanesque Road of Alsace.

The western facade of Marmoutier's church is famous for its massive but well balanced architecture, while inside, the 1710 pipe organ by Andreas Silbermann (completed in 1746 by his son, Johann Andreas Silbermann, and restored several times since) and the 18th-century choir stalls are among the most notable items on display.

== Gallery ==
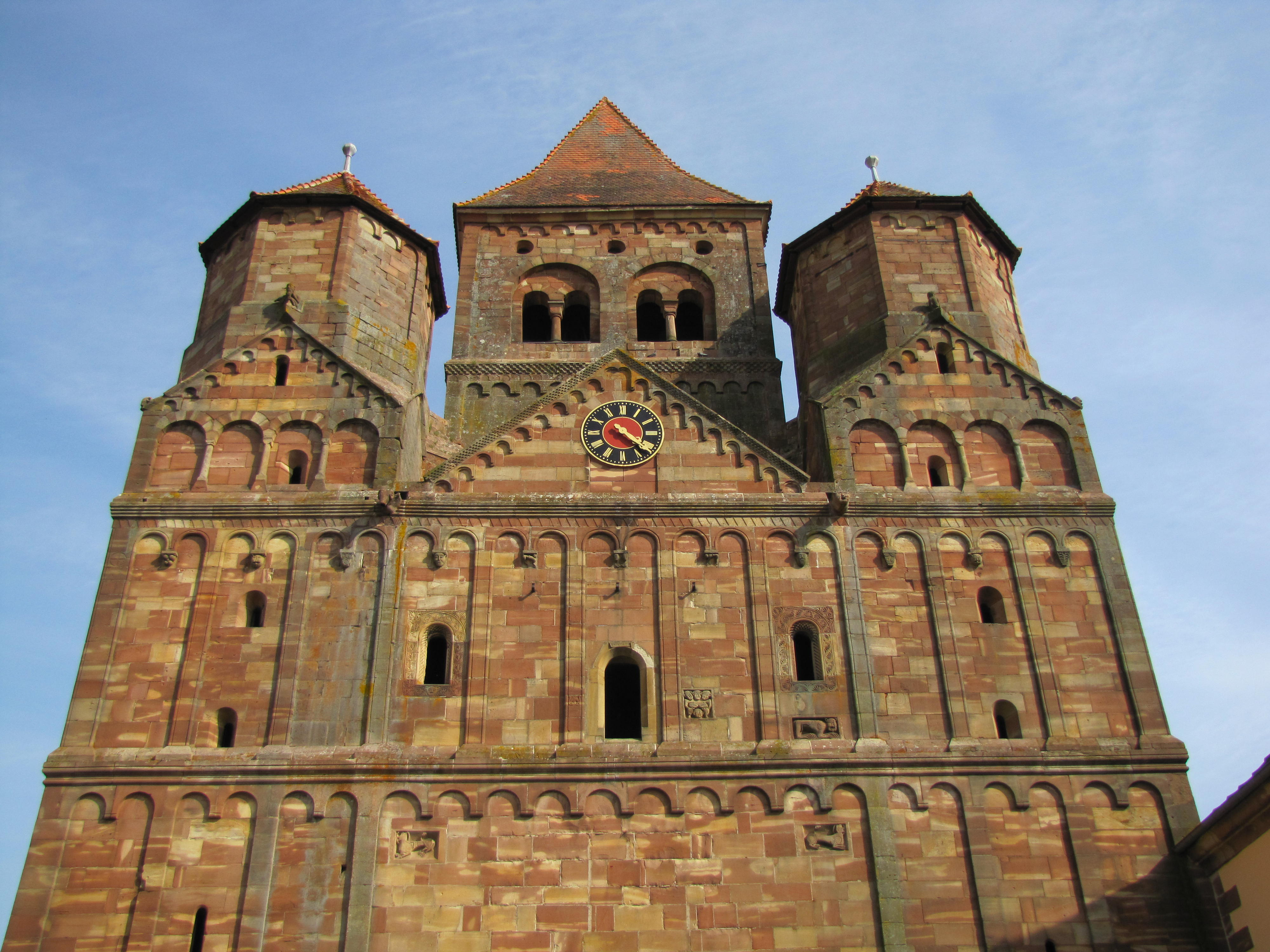
Upper part of the west facade

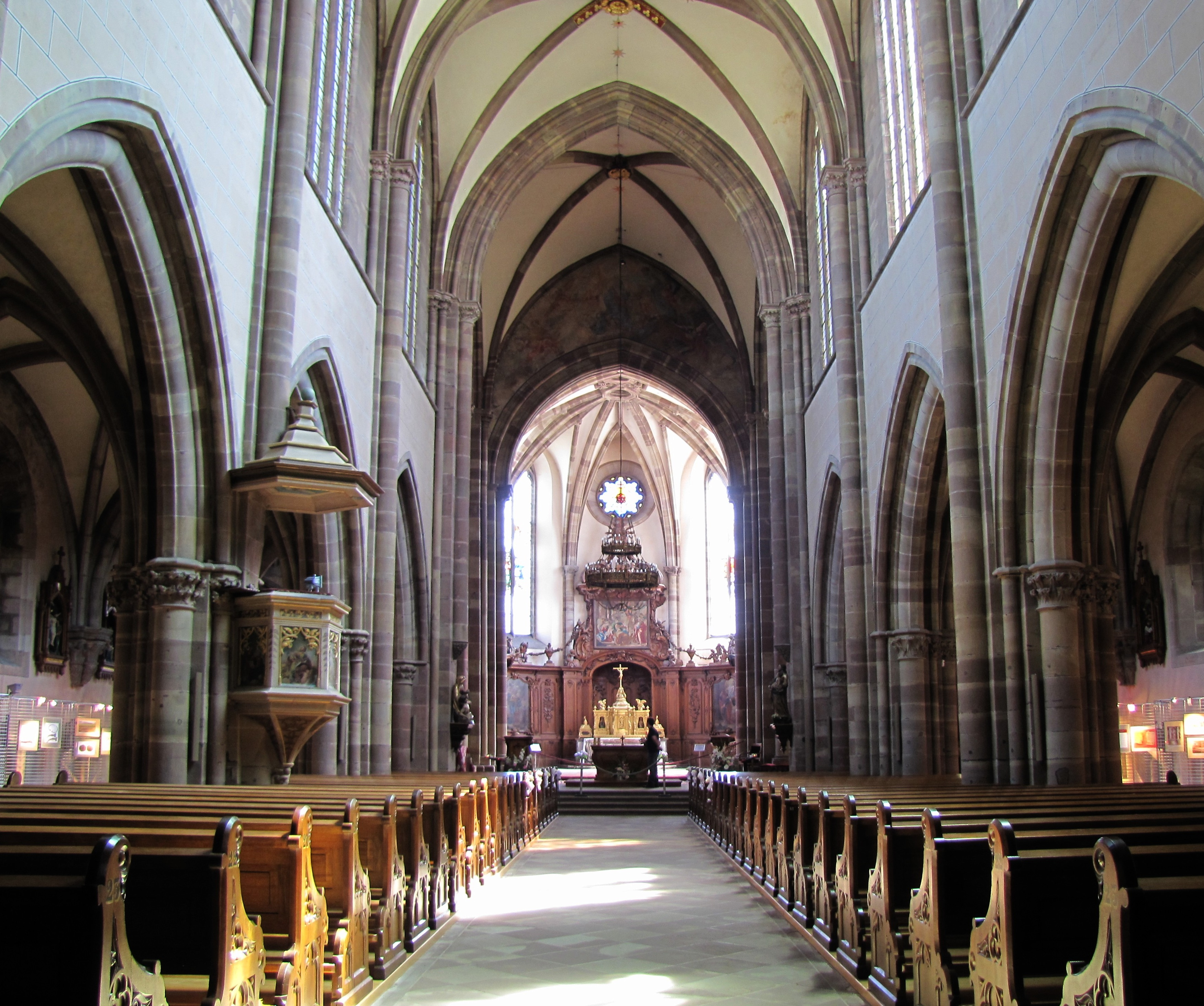
Inside, looking east

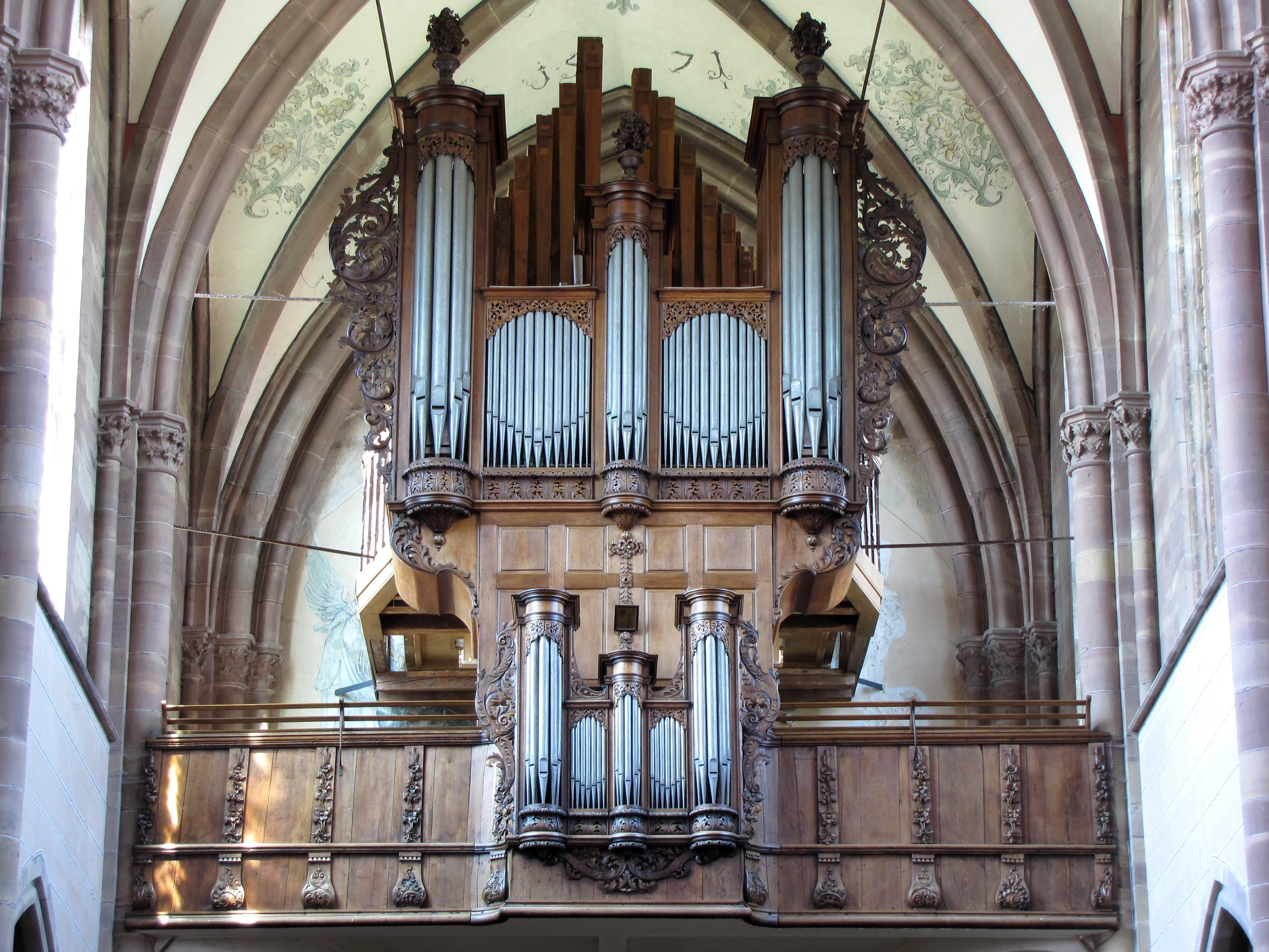
The 1710 pipe organ

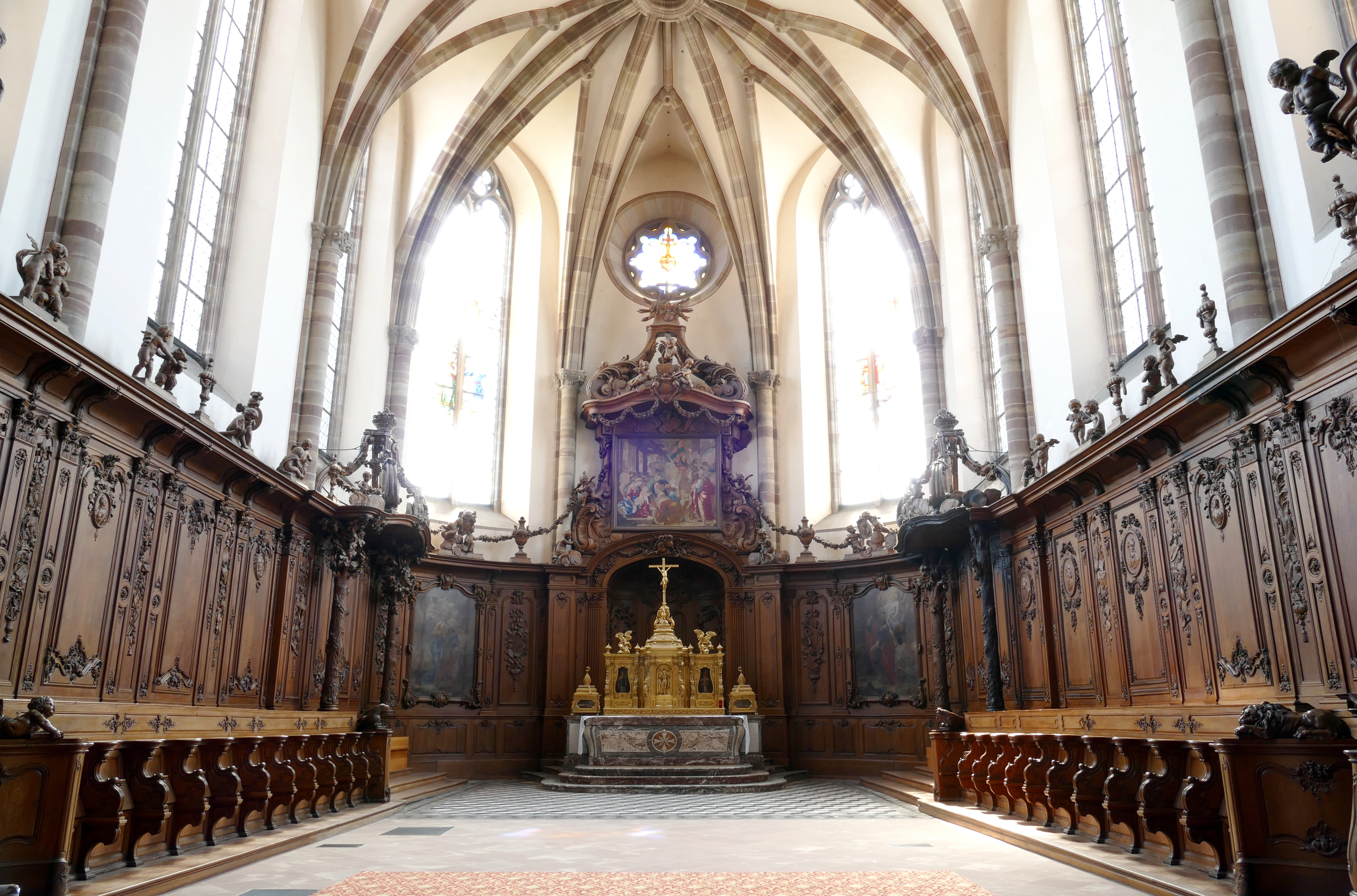
The 18th-century choir
