= Saint Nicholas Church, Strasbourg =

Coordinates: 48°34′42″N 7°44′54″E

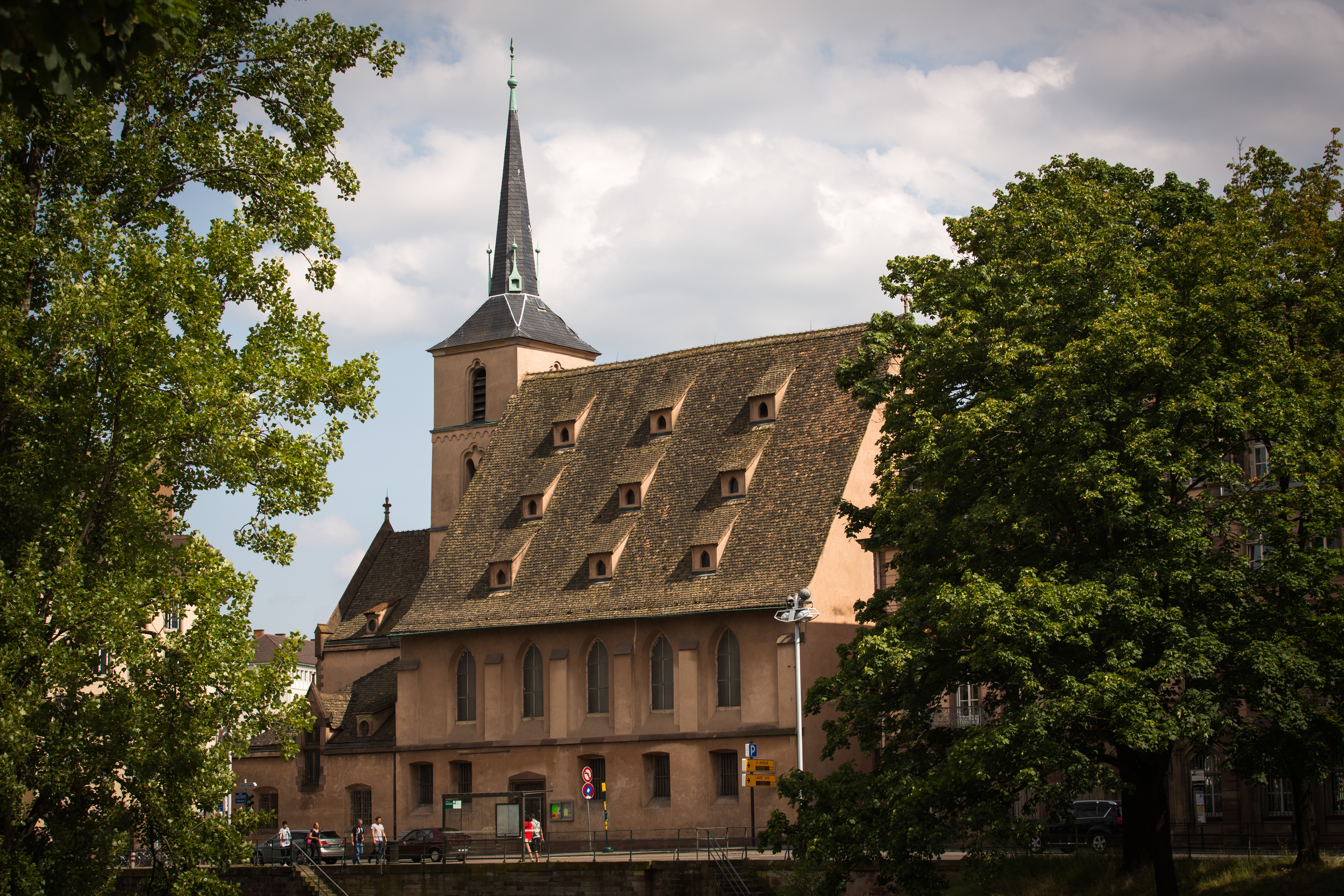
Side view

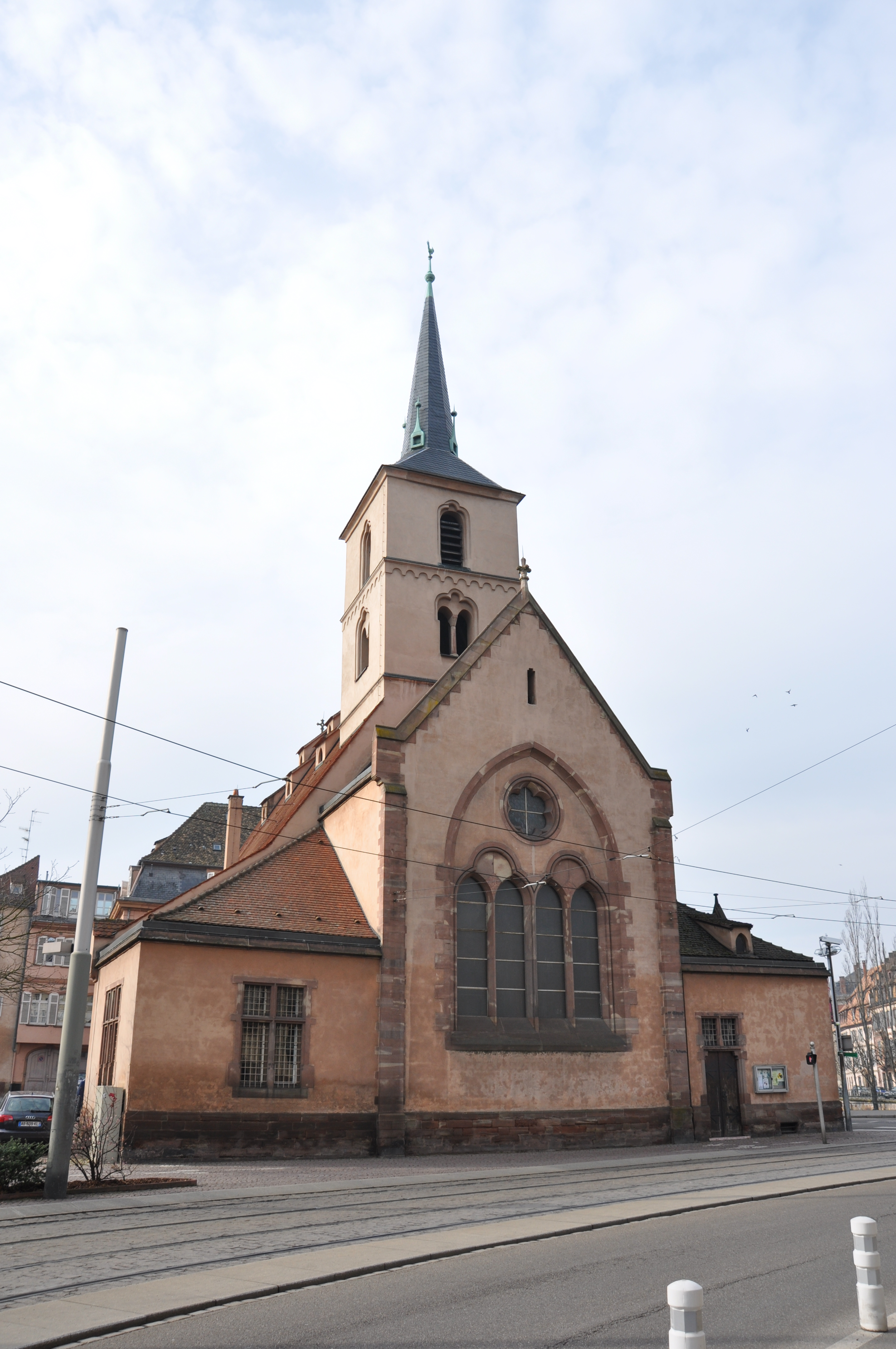
Front view

Saint Nicholas Church, Strasbourg (French: Église Saint-Nicolas; German: Nikolaikirche) is a small Gothic church in Strasbourg, France. Jean Calvin led services and preached at this church in 1538. Albert Schweitzer was the pastor of the church from 1900 to 1913 and used to play the organ there.

The Church no longer functions as a parish church, due to the decline of the population of the centre of Strasbourg. Today it is used by a Charismatic group called "Renouveau Saint Nicholas". The charismatic group, led by the pastors Daniel Hebert and Pastor Ringerbach, began renting the church for their Sunday services in 1975.

However, the Church remains affiliated to the Protestant Church of Augsburg Confession of Alsace and Lorraine (EPCAAL).

== History ==
The church was built between 1387 and 1454 on the site of an earlier church dedicated to Mary Magdalene. This earlier church, which dated from 1182, was founded by the Knight Walther Spender and had been built on the site of a small Roman fort. The tower with its tapering spire was erected in 1585. The interior was remodelled during the 17th century. The façade and the sacristy, which date from 1905, are by Émile Salomon, the architect of the Temple Neuf in Strasbourg.

While Schweitzer was pastor at the Church, on 11 April 1908 he celebrated the wedding of Elly Knapp and Theodor Heuss, who went on to become President of the Federal Republic of Germany.

The interior contains remains of 15th-century frescoes.

The 1707 organ of the brothers Andreas and Gottfried Silbermann was dismantled in 1967.
