= Tennenbach Abbey =

Former Cistercian monastery in Baden-Württemberg, Germany

Coordinates: 48.1449°N 7.8961°E

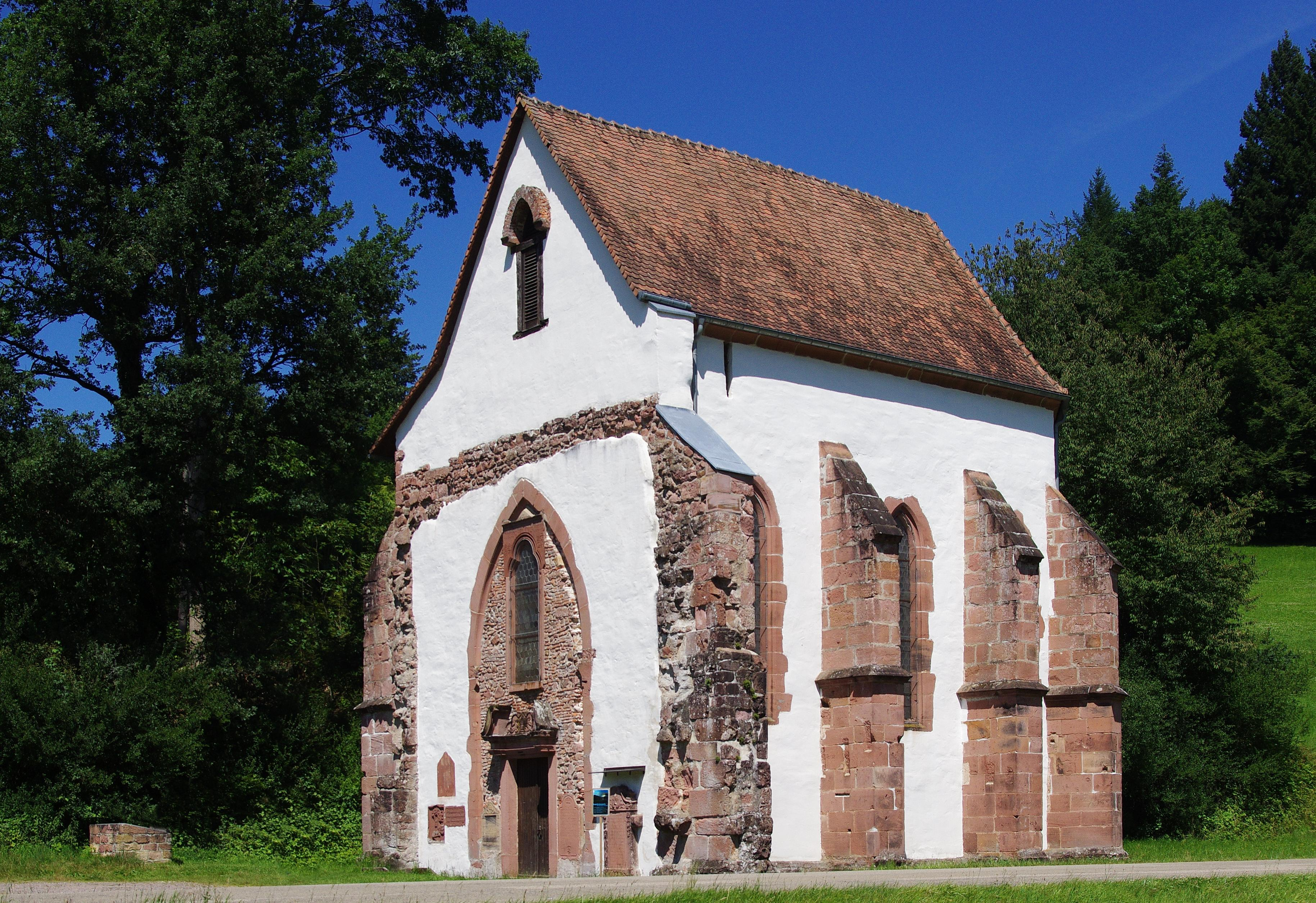
The hospital chapel

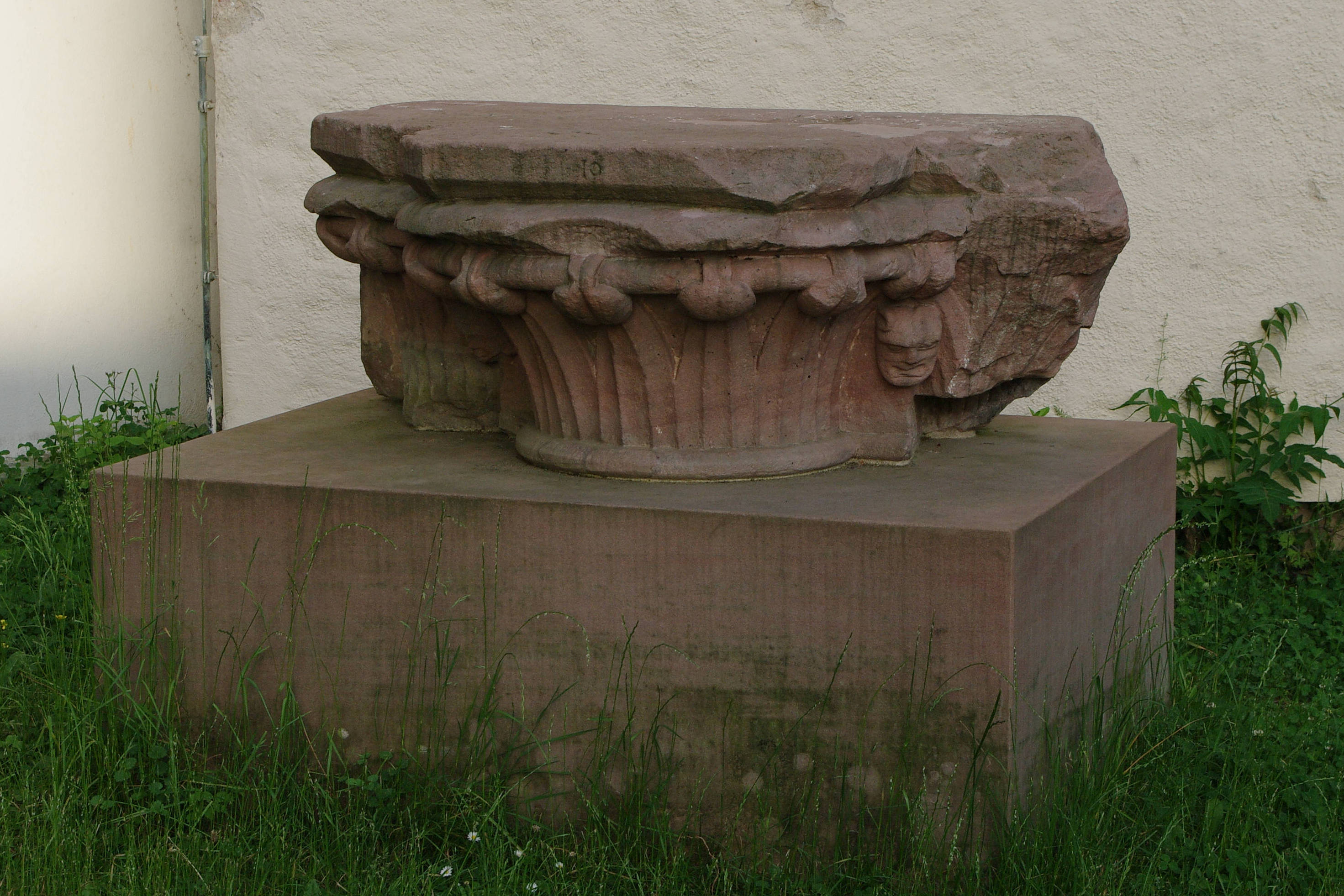
A capital from the abbey church, beside the new church of Saint Louis in Freiburg im Breisgau

Tennenbach Abbey (German: Kloster Tennenbach) was a Cistercian abbey in what is now the district of Freiamt in the town of Emmendingen, Baden-Württemberg, Germany. It was originally named Porta Coeli (Latin: 'Heaven's Gate').

It was founded around 1158 by monks from Frienisberg Abbey, a daughter house of Lucelle Abbey. Tennenbach later became a daughter house of Morimond Abbey and from 1182 of Salem Abbey. The abbot of Tennenbach was also supervisory abbot of Günterstal Abbey, a nearby nunnery, from shortly after its foundation in 1224 until around 1380.

It was dissolved in 1806 and demolished in 1829, though the abbey's hospital chapel from the second half of the 13th century survives. The abbey church was taken down and rebuilt in Freiburg im Breisgau as a parish church dedicated to Saint Louis; this was destroyed by Allied bombing in 1944 and a new parish church built to replace it.
