= Church of Saint Maurice (Ebersmunster) =

Coordinates: 48°18′40″N 7°31′37″E

- Abbatiale Saint-Maurice d'Ebersmunster; Église Saint-Maurice d'Ebersmunster
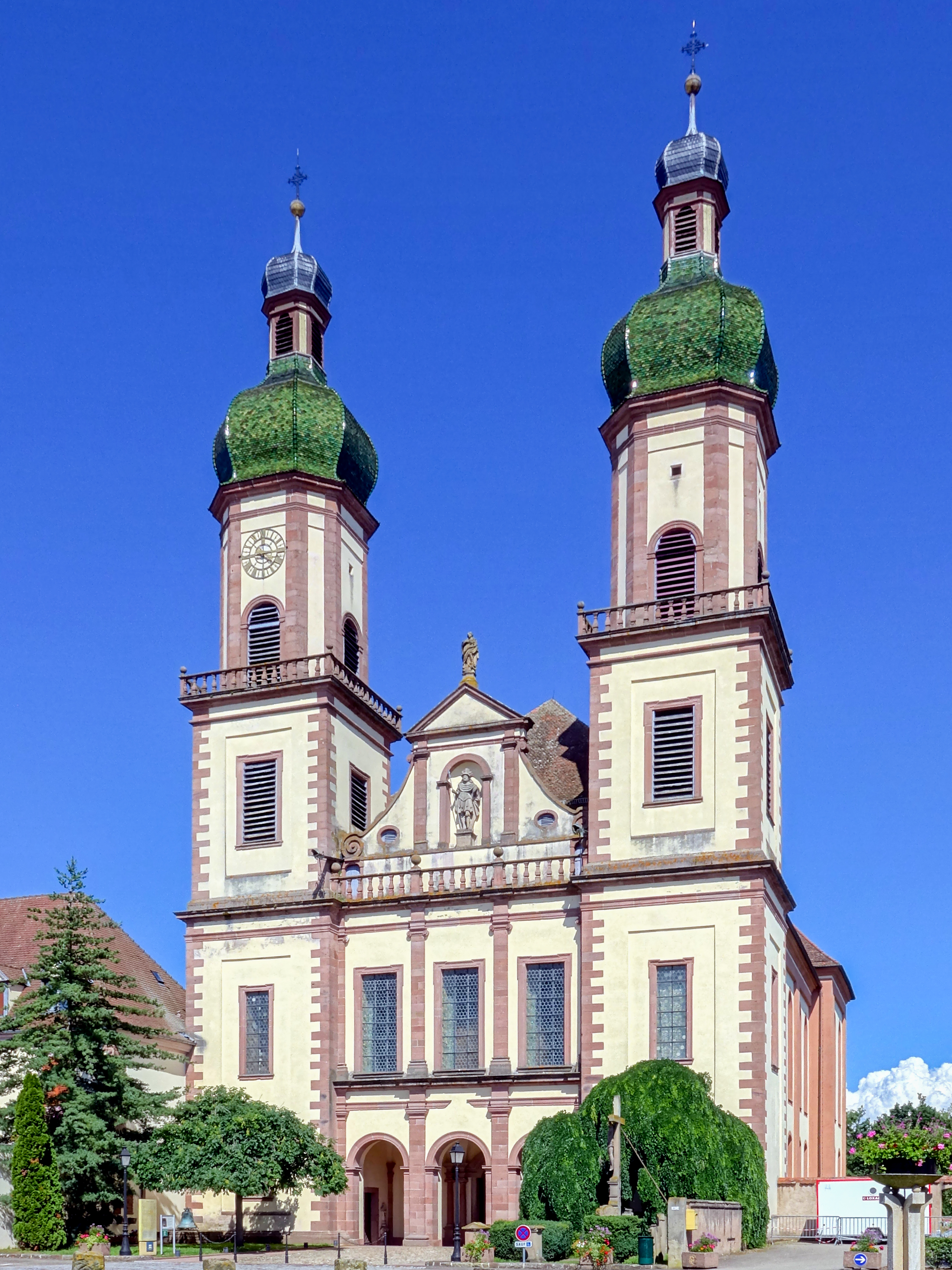
- Church of Saint Maurice
- Location: Ebersmunster
- Country: France
- Denomination: Roman Catholic Church

Architecture
- Heritage designation: Monument historique
- Designated: 1898
- Architect: Peter Thumb
- Style: Baroque architecture
- Completed: 1727

Specifications
- Length: 68.9 m (226 ft)
- Width: 25 m (82 ft)
- Height: 47.8 m (157 ft)

Administration
- Archdiocese: Strasbourg

The (former) Abbey church Saint Maurice (French: Abbatiale Saint-Maurice) is the main attraction of the village of Ebersmunster near Sélestat, Alsace. The church completed in 1727, the work of Vorarlberg architect Peter Thumb, is considered one of the most beautiful Baroque churches in France.

== Description ==
Saint Maurice served as the abbey church of a now defunct Benedictine monastery, founded in the 7th century and belonging to the oldest in Alsace. The relatively plain exterior of the building, construction of which was started in the late 17th century to replace a much older predecessor, is related in its rectangular floor plan to a medieval form of architectural language and indicates nothing of the richness of the interior design and furnishing. These are largely the work of Tyrolean artists: the ceiling paintings (1730–1733), with depictions of the legends of Maurice and of Benedict are by Josef Mattes (nave) and Joseph Mages (chorus, transept, crossing); the choir and confessionals were also made by Tyrolians. Some Alsatians and Germans were however involved in the design of the bright and colorful interior: The expressive Samson pulpit (see also St. George's Church, Sélestat) is a work by Clemens Winterhalder and the mighty main altar (1728) one by Jean-Léonard Meyer from Sélestat The other altars are works by Anton von Wihl, from Sélestat, and Anton Ketterer, from Colmar.

In the church there is also a pipe organ constructed 1730–1732 by Andreas Silbermann, which is one of the best preserved works of the famous organ builder. It was carefully restored in 1997–1999.

Each year between May and July, a concert series, Les heures musicales d'Ebersmunster is held in the abbey church, the benefits going to its restoration.

== Dimensions ==
The main dimensions are as follows

- Outside length: 68.9 m (226 ft)
- Outer width of the facade:25 m (82 ft)
- Inside length: 56.8 m (186 ft)
- Width of nave: 19.9 m (65 ft)
- Width of choir: 12.3 m (40 ft)
- Internal height of nave: 19.3 m (63 ft)
- Internal height of choir: 16.3 m (53 ft)
- Height of façade towers: 47.8 m (157 ft)
- Height of rear tower: 44.7 m (147 ft)

== Repair works ==
In 2004, cracks are found on the walls of the rear tower (called Tour des païens or Tower of the heathen). Checks showed that the foundation's support of the tower is no longer sufficient and that this part of the building was in danger of collapse. In 2007, the municipality brought in as temporary solution steel supports to the outer tower. On 29 January 2009, after lengthy calculation and distribution of costs on state, region, department and community the construction works for the permanent consolidation and restoration of the tower began. Between 2001 and 2004, the nave's altars and ceiling had already been restored.

== Gallery ==
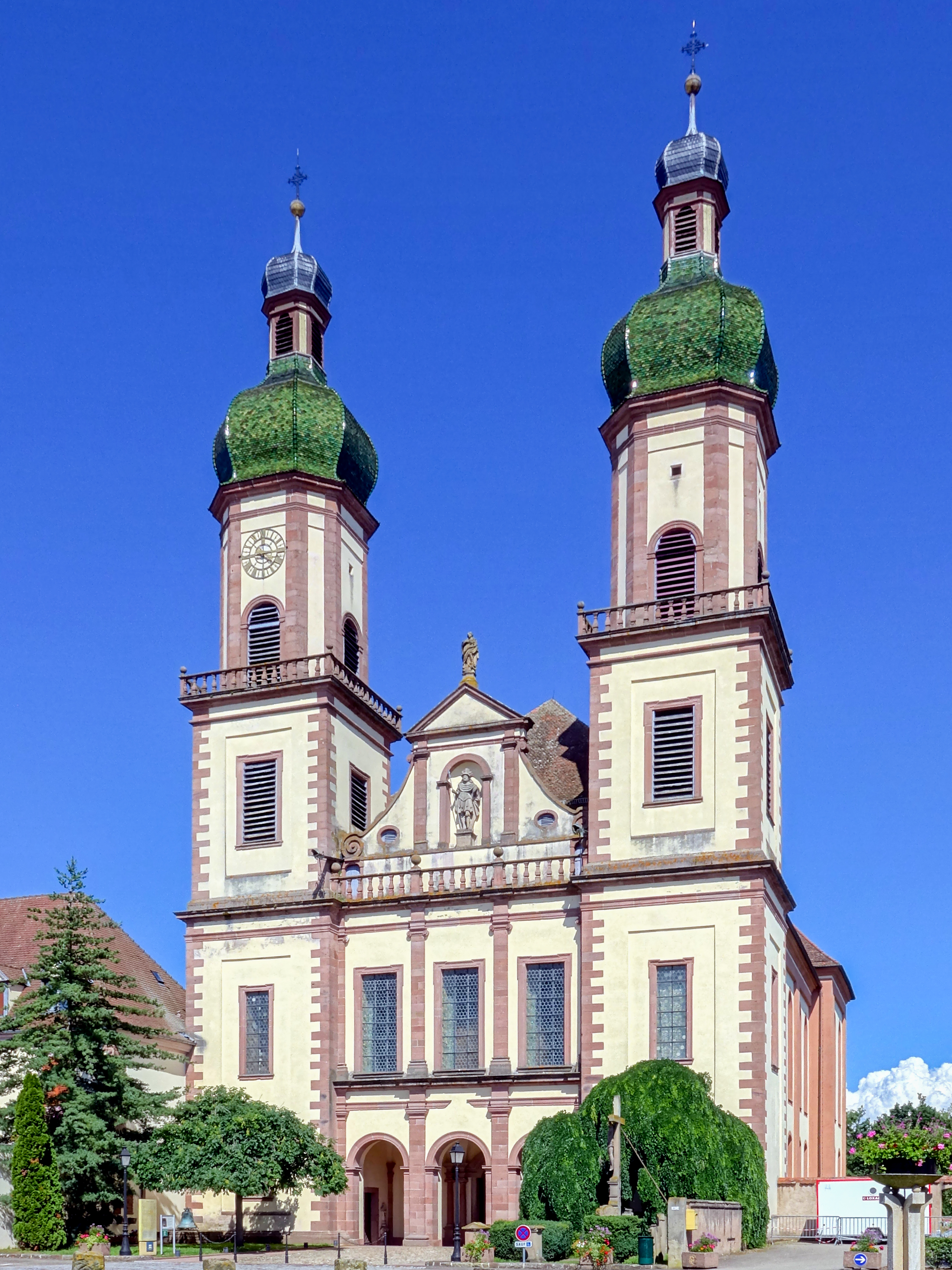

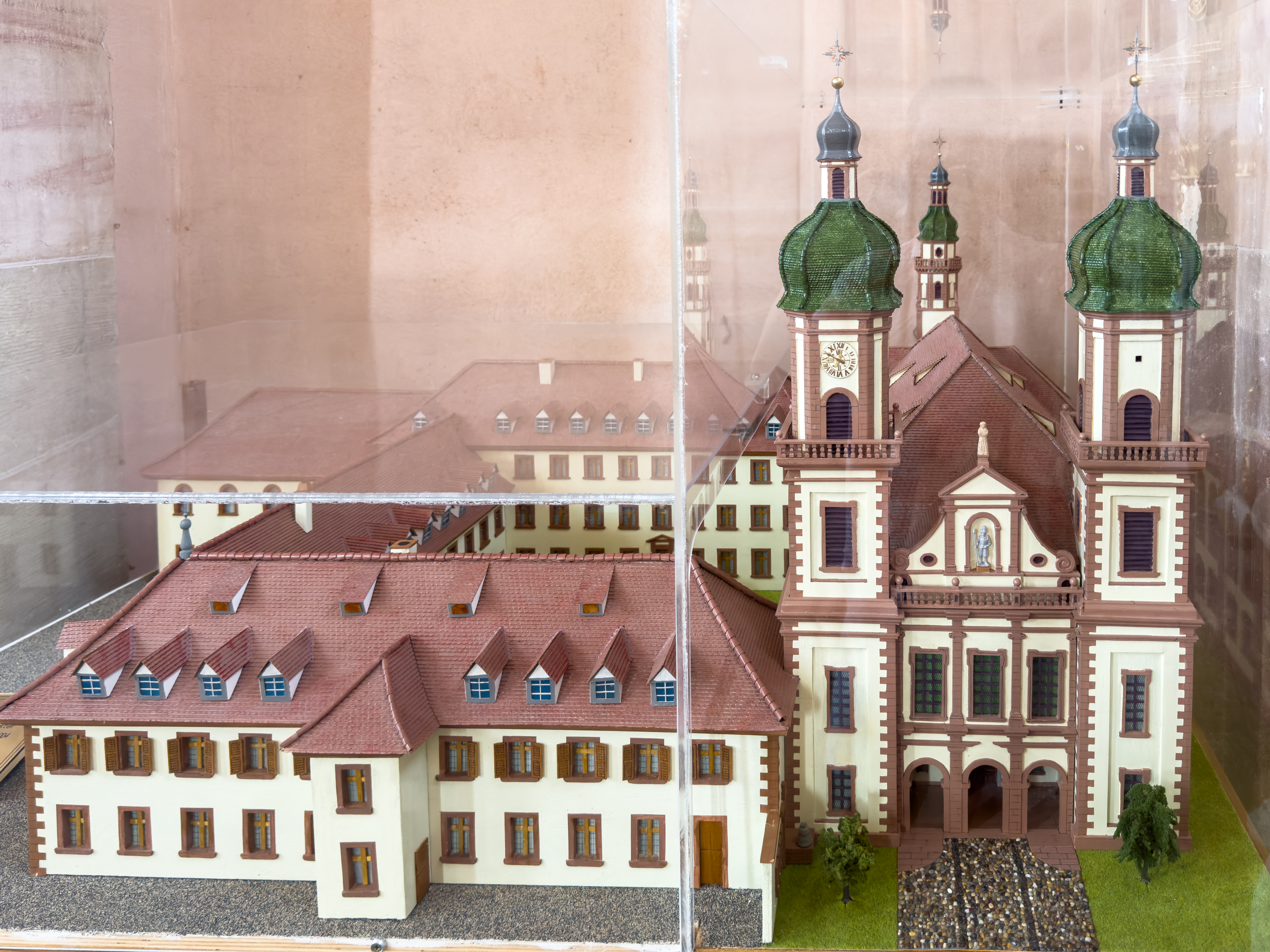

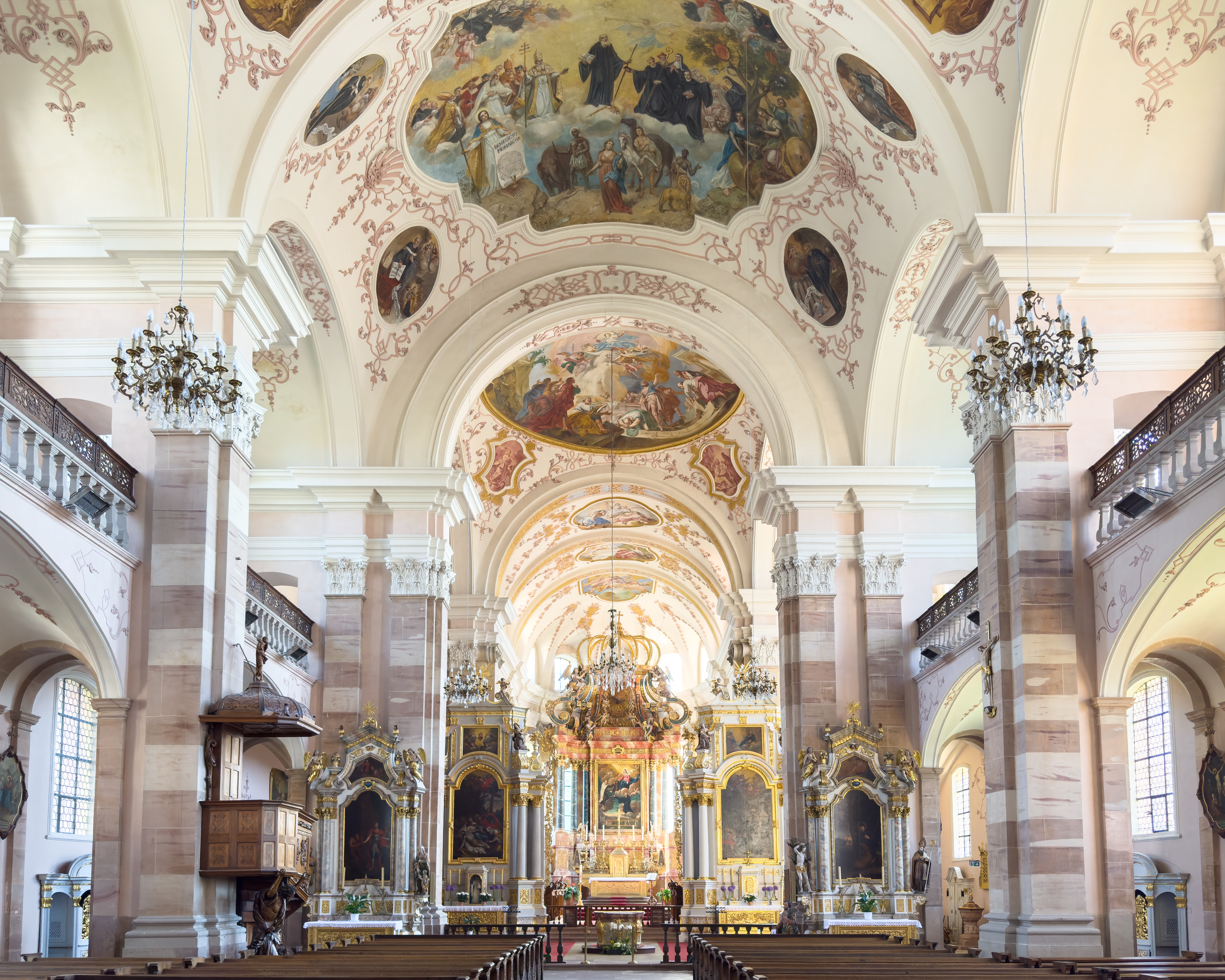

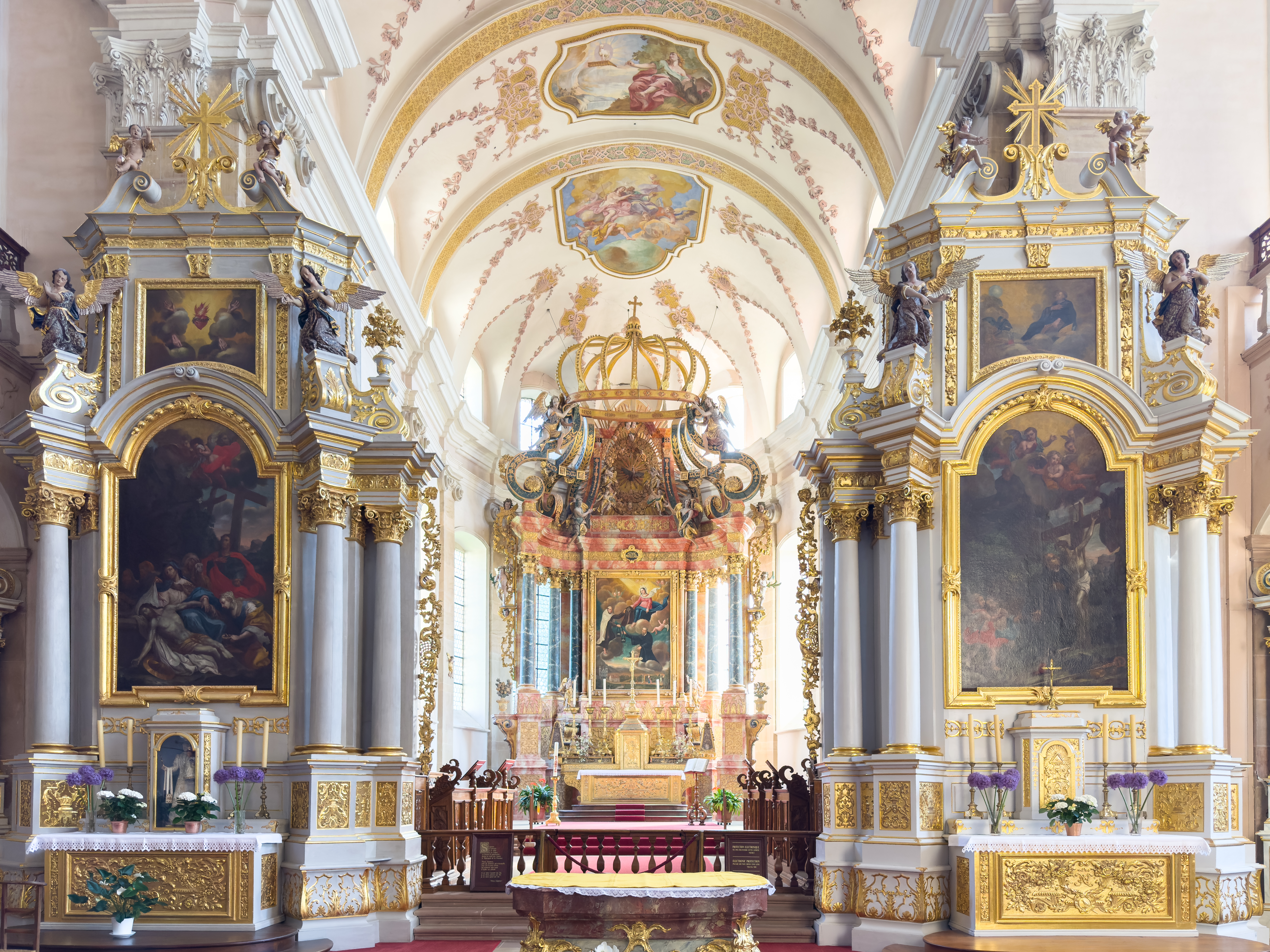

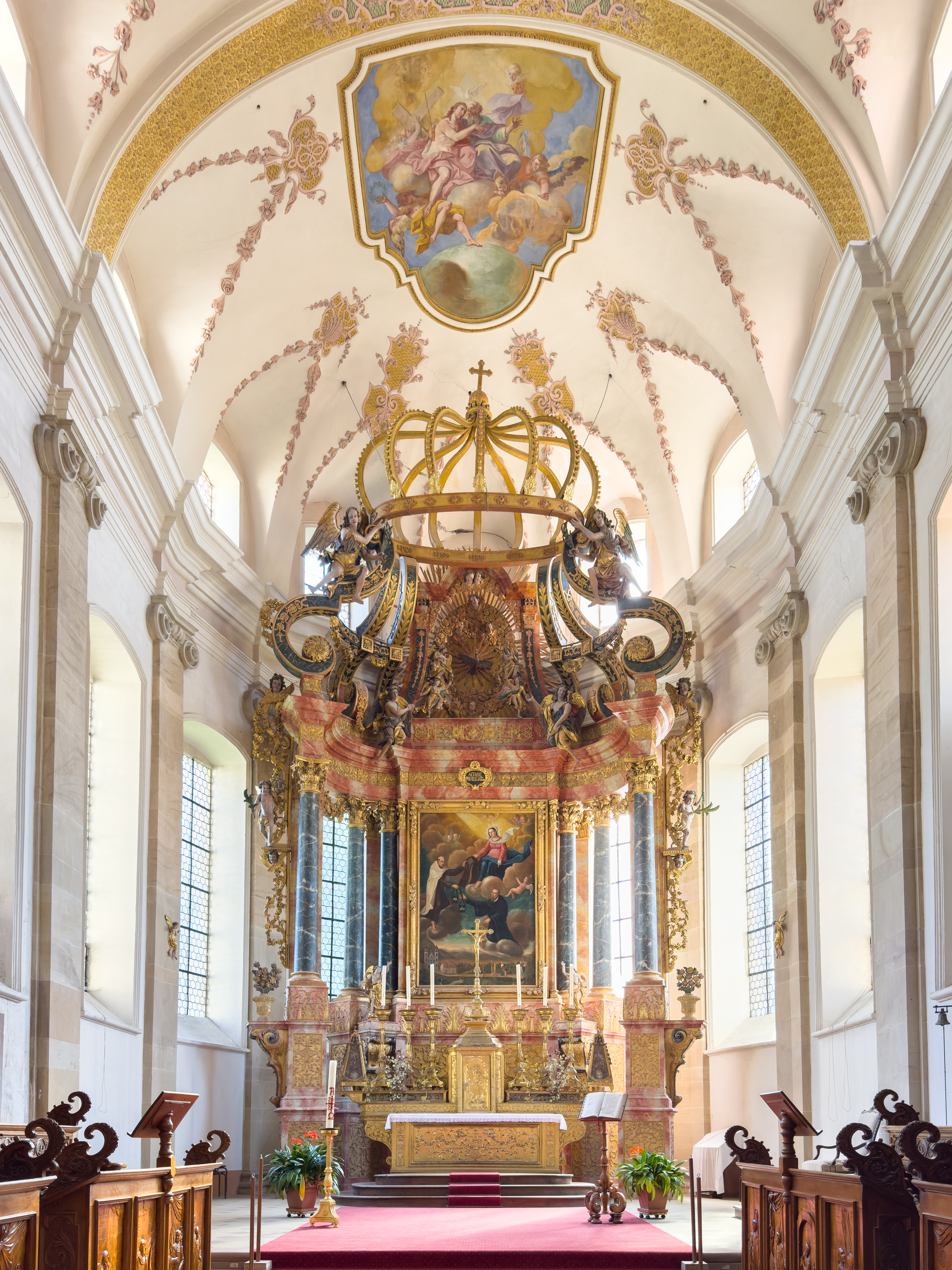

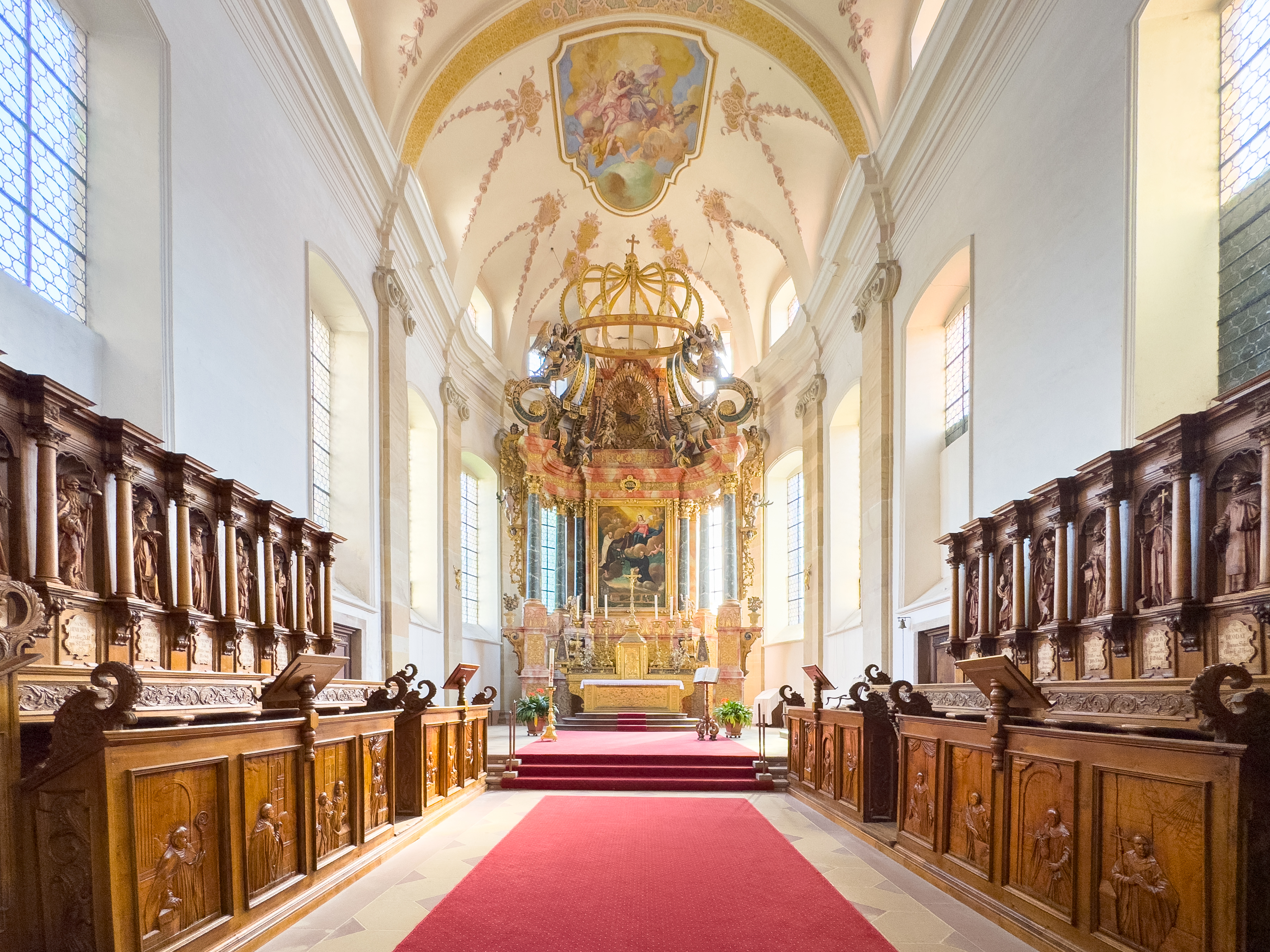

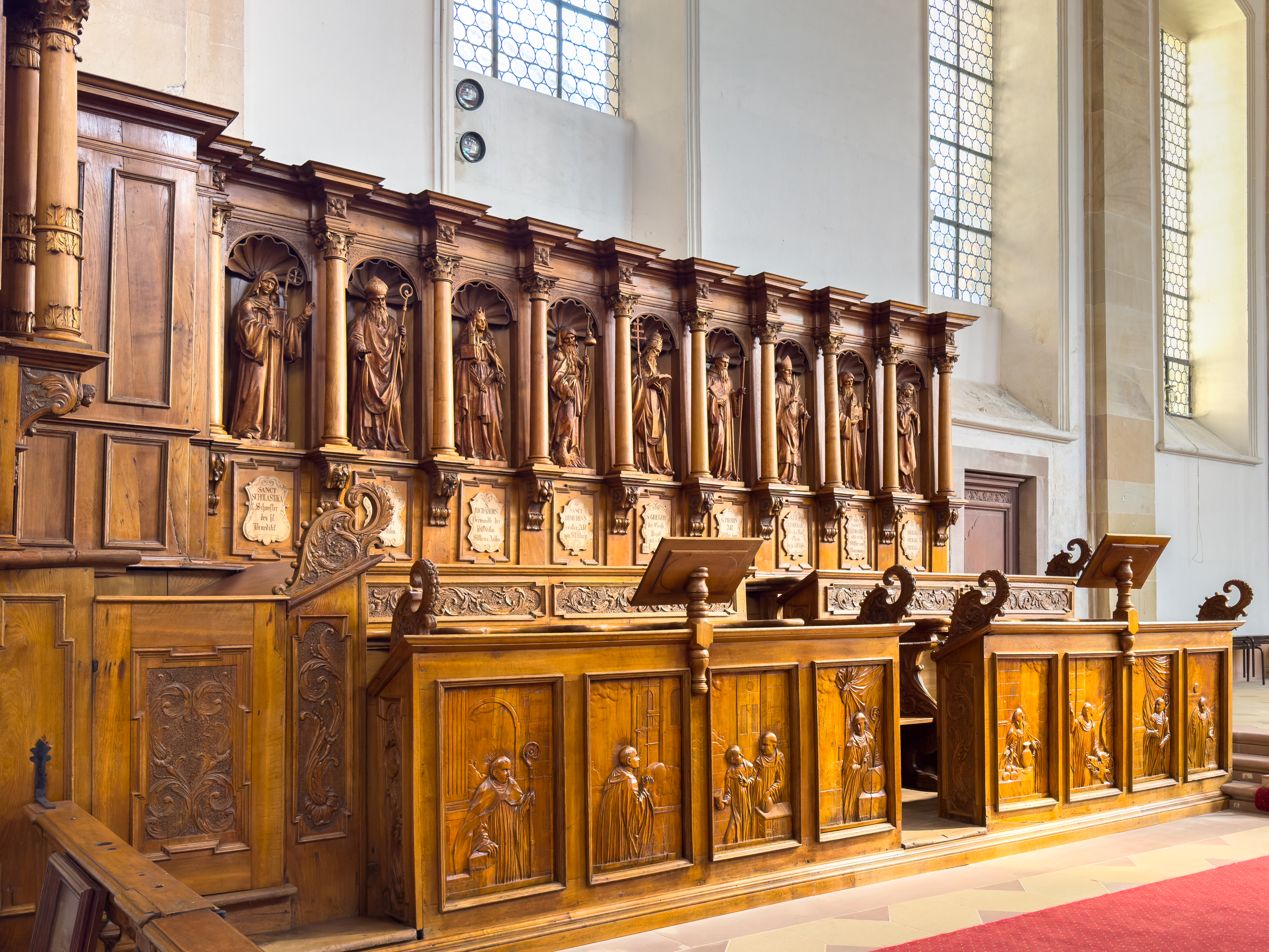

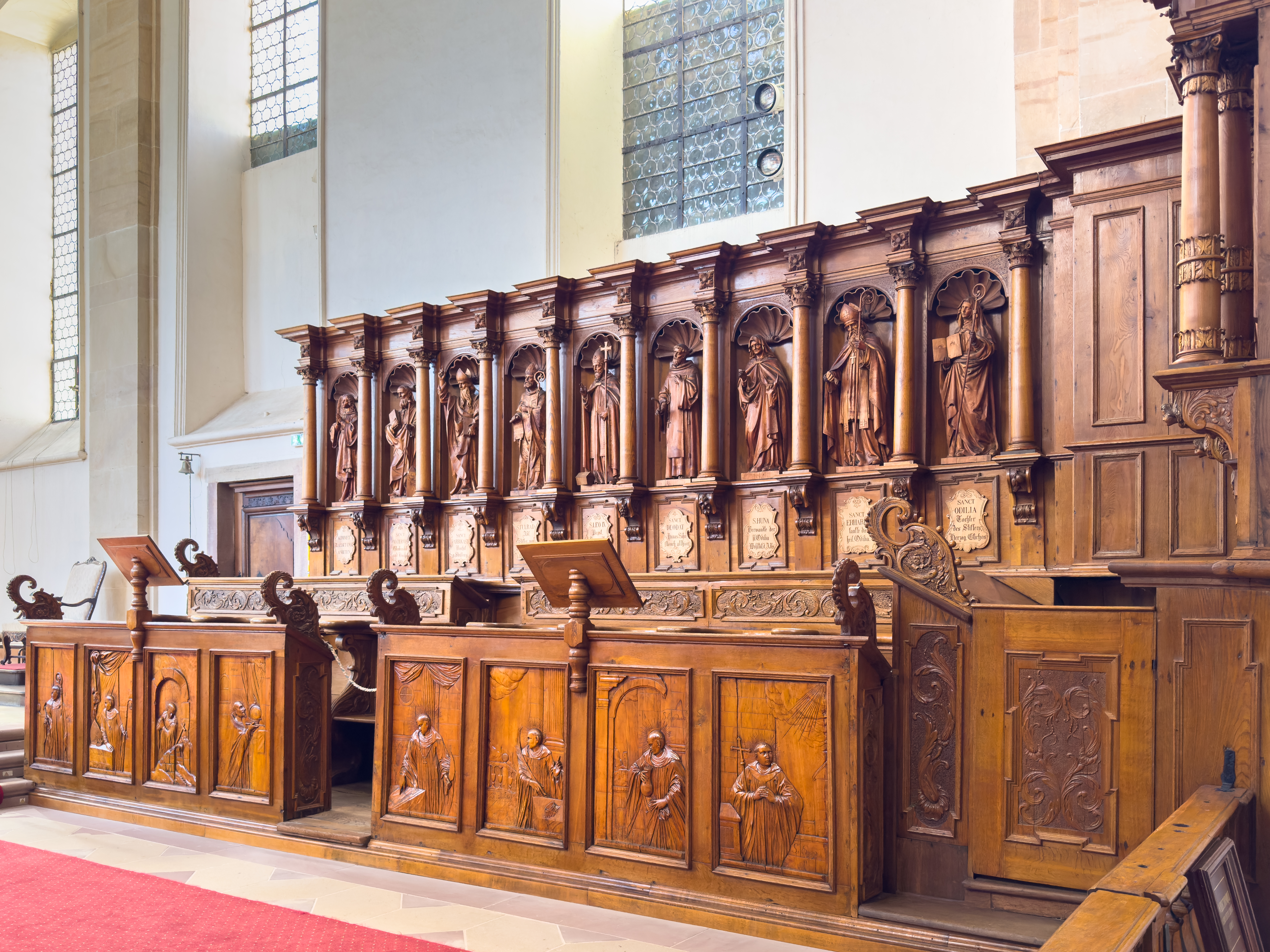

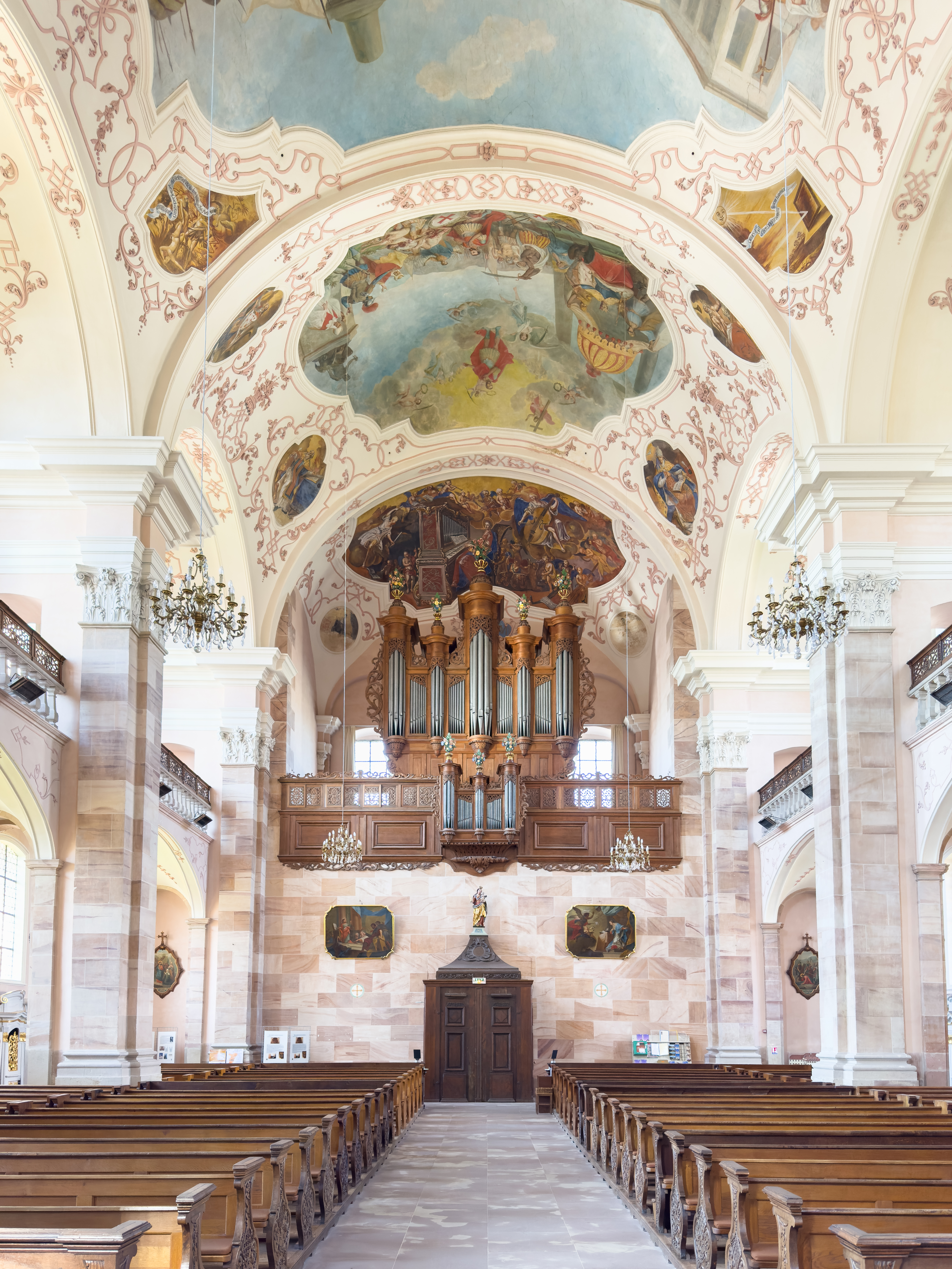

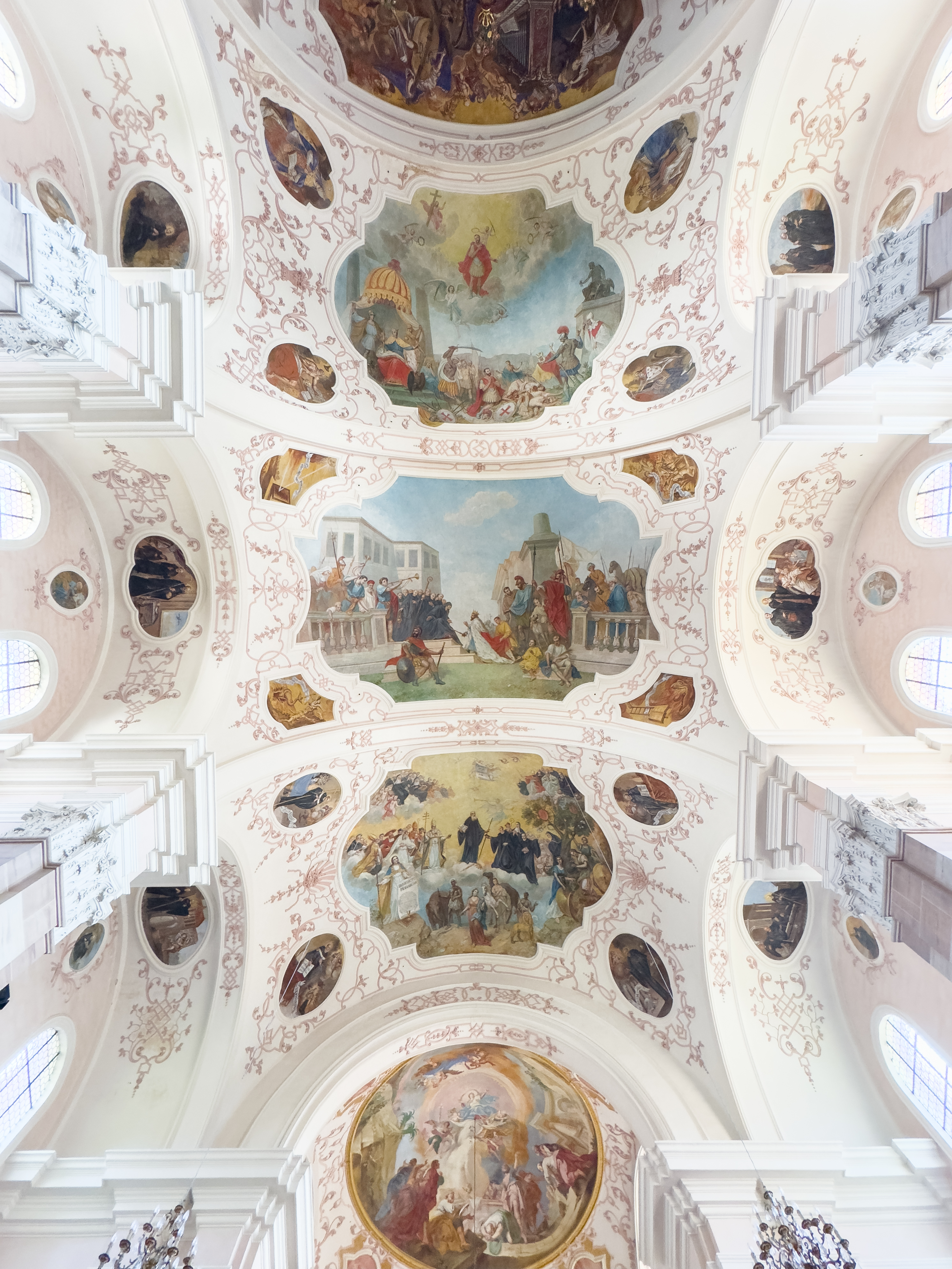

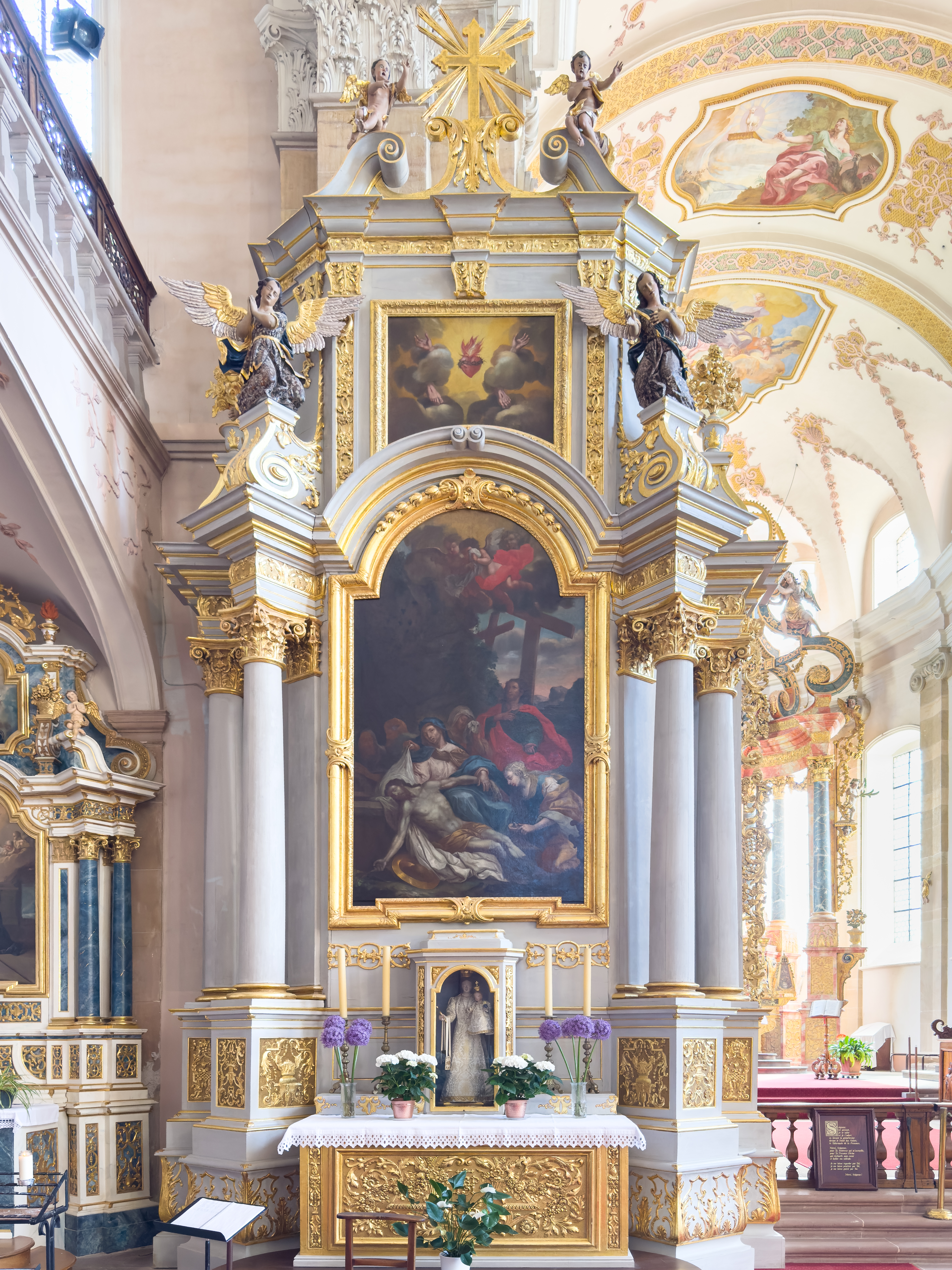

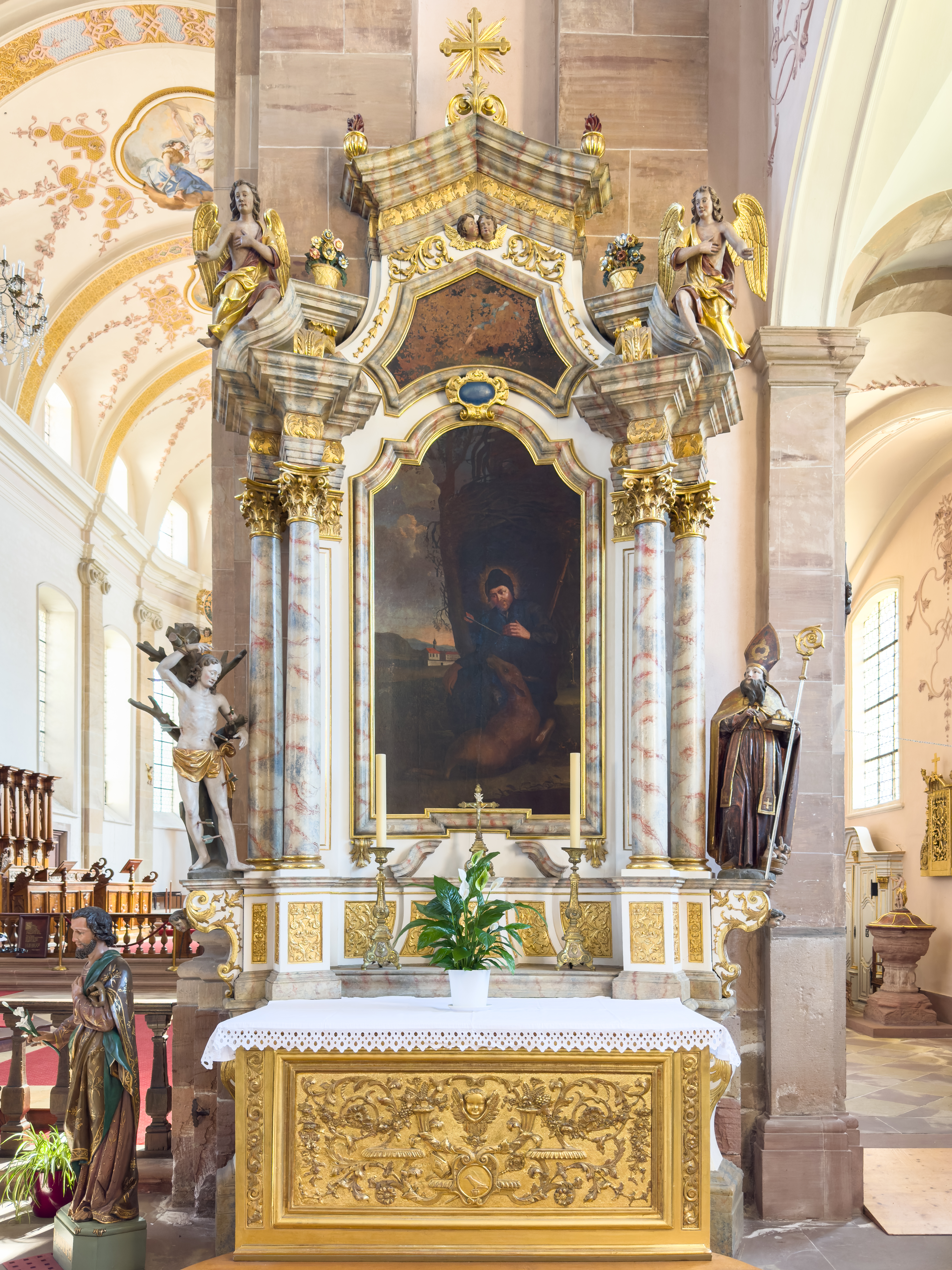

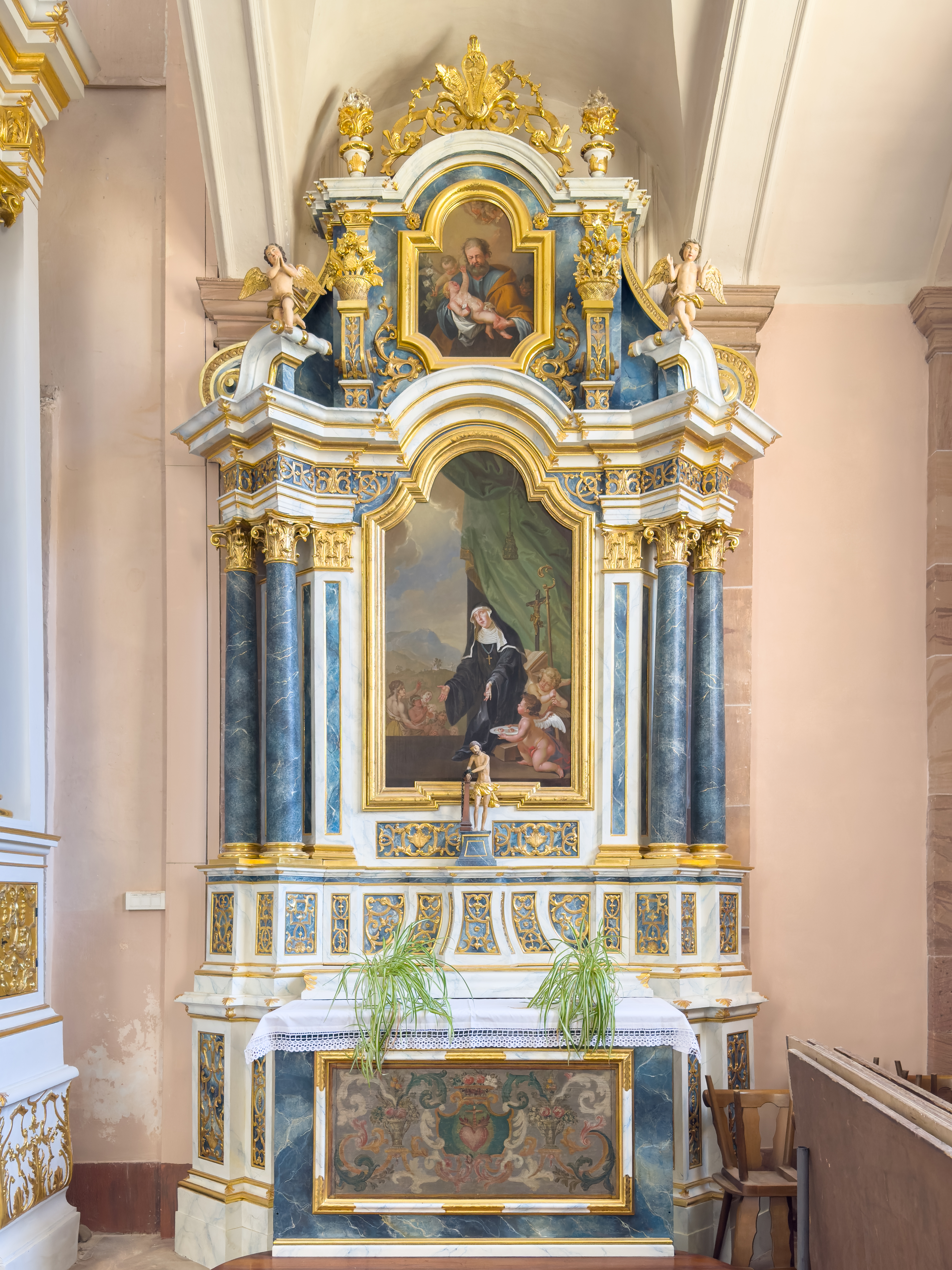

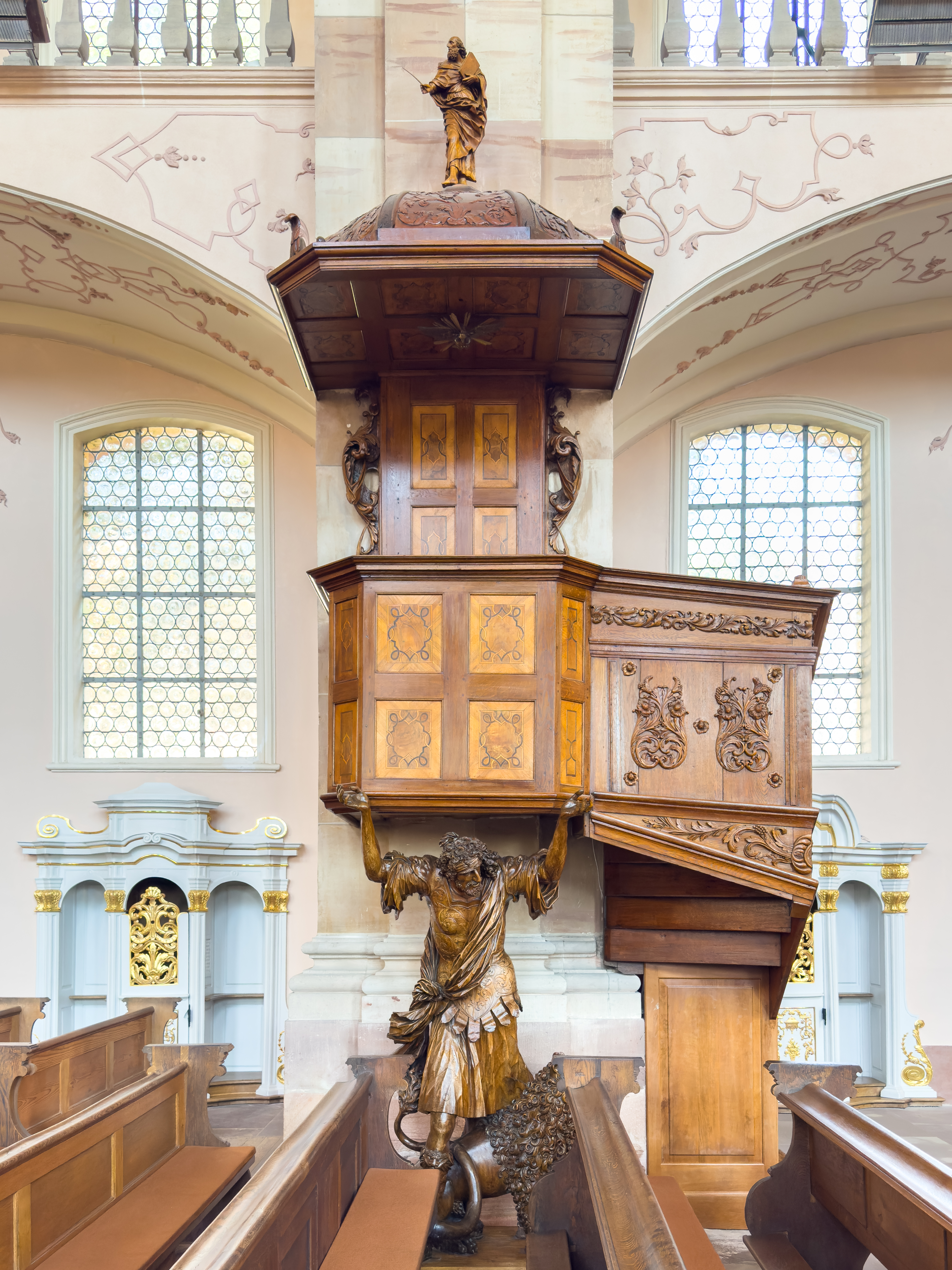
