= Ebersmunster =

Ebersmunster Awerschmínster
- Commune
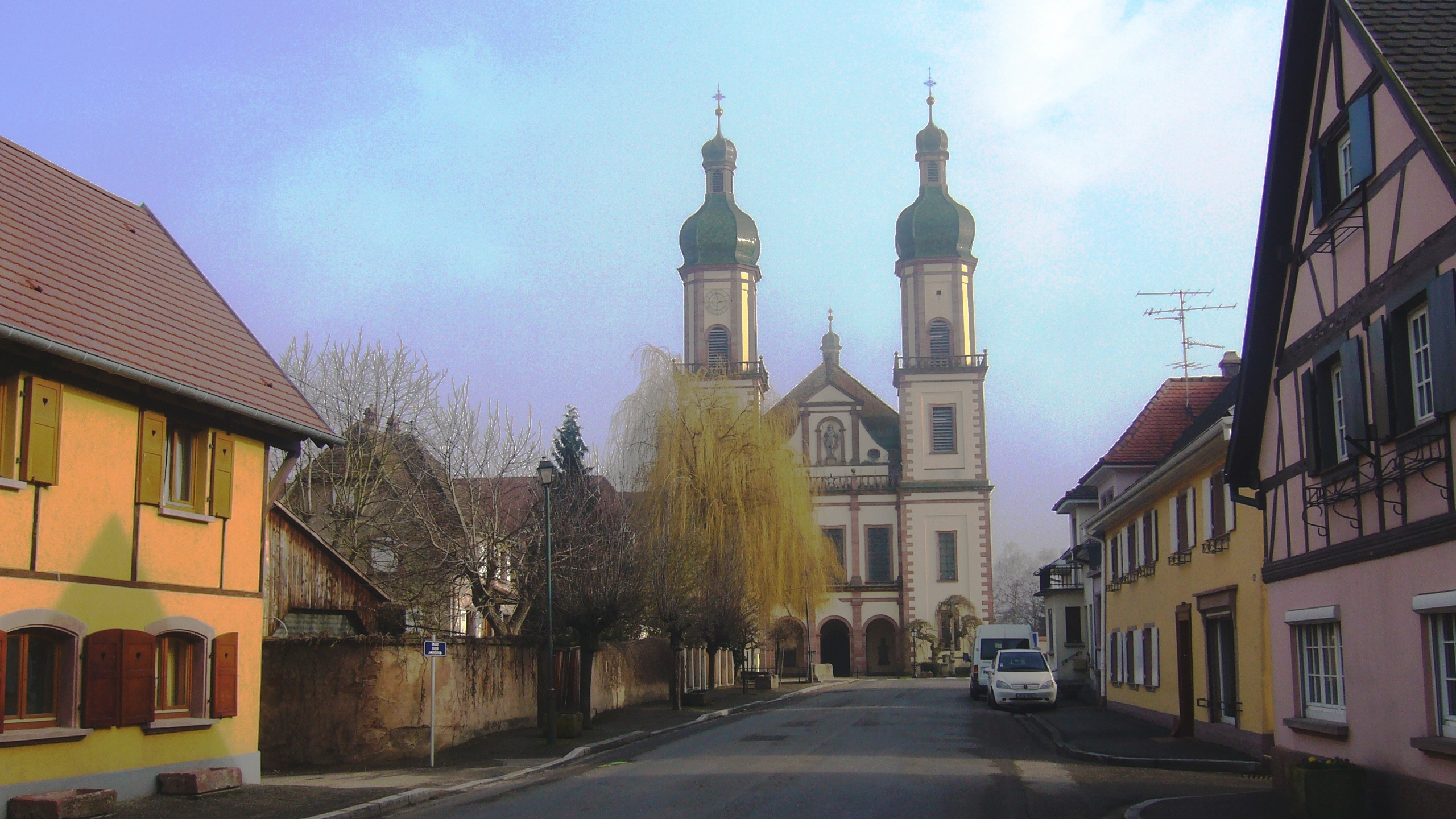
- The abbey church in Ebersmunster

- Coat of arms
- Location of Ebersmunster
- Location within France Location within Grand Est
- Coordinates: 48°18′43″N 7°31′29″E
- Country: France
- Region: Grand Est
- Department: Bas-Rhin
- Arrondissement: Sélestat-Erstein
- Canton: Sélestat
- Intercommunality: Sélestat

Government
  - Mayor (2020–2026): Sylvie Hirtz
- Area^{1}: 7.39 km^{2} (2.85 sq mi)
- Highest elevation: 168 m (551 ft)
- Lowest elevation: 160 m (520 ft)
- Population (2023): 574
  - Density: 77.7/km^{2} (201/sq mi)
- Time zone: UTC+01:00 (CET)
  - Summer (DST): UTC+02:00 (CEST)
- INSEE/Postal code: 67116 /67600
- ^{1} French Land Register data, which excludes lakes, ponds, glaciers > 1 km^{2} (0.386 sq mi or 247 acres) and river estuaries.

Ebersmunster (French pronunciation: [ebɛʁsmœ̃stɛʁ]; German: Ebersmünster) is a commune in the Bas-Rhin department in Alsace in north-eastern France.

It is famous for its 1727 baroque church, a work by Vorarlberg architect Peter Thumb.

== Population ==
Historical population
| Year | Pop. | ±% p.a. |
|---|---|---|
| 1968 | 436 | — |
| 1975 | 407 | −0.98% |
| 1982 | 434 | +0.92% |
| 1990 | 445 | +0.31% |
| 1999 | 435 | −0.25% |
| 2007 | 460 | +0.70% |
| 2012 | 479 | +0.81% |
| 2017 | 521 | +1.70% |
| 2023 | 574 | +1.63% |
Source: INSEE

== See also ==
- Communes of the Bas-Rhin department
