= Peter Thumb =

Austrian architect

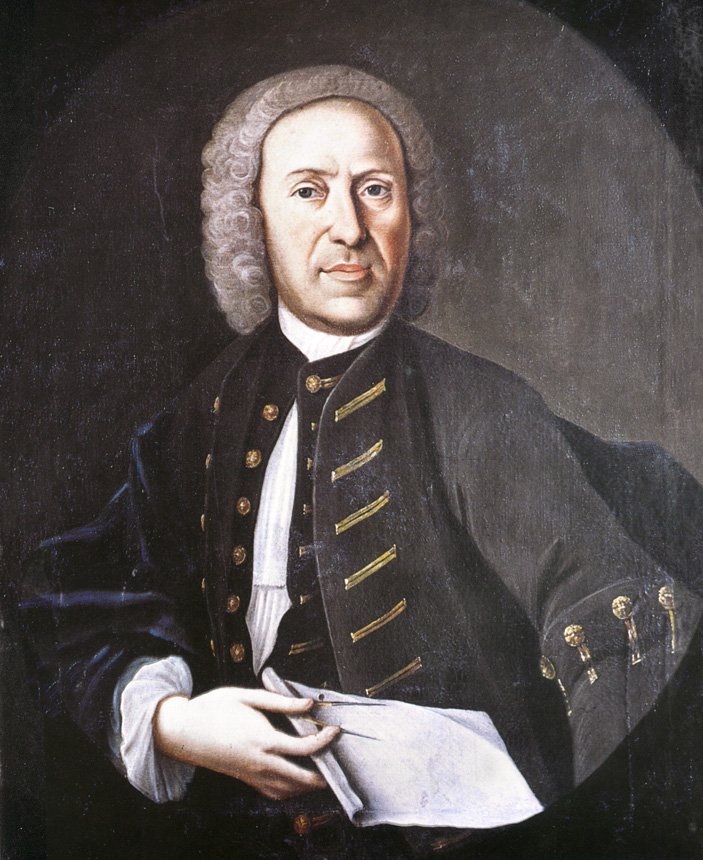
Peter Thumb

Peter Thumb (18 December 1681 – 4 March 1766) was an Austrian architect and master builder. He was a member of the Vorarlberg School and is best known for his Rococo architecture, mainly in Southern Germany. His family came from Bezau, Vorarlberg, in the westernmost part of Austria, and he was active in Baden, the Black Forest, Alsace, Upper Swabia, on and around Lake Constance, and in Switzerland. Outstanding examples of his work include the pilgrimage church at Birnau on Lake Constance and the monastery library at the Abbey of Saint Gall, Saint Gallen, Switzerland.

== Life ==
Peter Thumb was born in Bezau on 18 December 1681, a son of the Vorarlberg master builder Michael Thumb. He first went to work for the stonemason Michael Berbig in Au (Vorarlberg), then worked for his later father-in-law, the master builder Franz Beer and was member of the Auer Zunft (Vorarlberg School). His first major works were the St. Mauritius Abbey Church (Ebersmunster) in Alsace and the church and library of the St. Peter Monastery in the Black Forest. In 1725 he was granted citizenship in Constance, Germany, and in 1737 he became a member of the city's Grand Council.

After St. Peter, Thumb abandoned the traditional Vorarlberg wall pier scheme of church construction. As in the pilgrimage church of Birnau, Thumb made use of two architectural devices in Mengen, Germany (1741-1744). Firstly, he added a continuous gallery connected to the organ gallery halfway up the wall. Secondly, he created space for two side altars with two arched cantilevers (conches) in the fourth nave axis. For the project "Mengen" in 2003 in the Generallandesarchiv Karlsruhe numerous floor plans and elevations were made accessible, unknown up until then.

The pilgrimage church Birnau, which he built in 1747-1750 for the Salem Monastery, is considered his masterpiece. Thumb created solid architecture, in combination with Joseph Anton Feuchtmayer's playful figurative decoration and Gottfried Bernhard Göz's ceiling frescoes. With its majestic, picturesque location on Lake Constance, Birnau is one of the main sights on the Upper Swabian Baroque Route (Oberschwäbische Barockstraße).

Thumb’s Abbey Library of St. Gall is one of the most important Baroque libraries. Together with the entire monastery complex of the Fürstabtei St. Gallen, it enjoys the status of World Cultural Heritage site. The east facade and other parts of the monastery church in St. Gall were built by Johann Michael Beer von Bildstein, presumably according to designs by Peter Thumb.

Thumb died in Konstanz on 4 March 1766.

== Impact and acclaim ==
Streets have been named after Thumb in Freiburg im Breisgau, St. Peter (Hochschwarzwald), Friedenweiler, Rust (Baden), Waldkirch, Cologne, Konstanz, Hilzingen, Singen (Hohentwiel), Waldshut-Tiengen, Weingarten (Württemberg), and Bregenz. The parish church in Schwerzen is said to have been built after his model. The steeple of the Assumption (Schuttern) Conventual Church, from 1722-23, is also attributed to him.

Thumb's works include:

- Parish Church Lachen in Canton Schwyz, 1707-1711.
- St. Mauritius Abbey Church (Ebersmunster) in Alsace, 1708-1712 (facade and towers) and 1719-1727.
- Church of St. Martin in Erstein, 1715, later neo-Romanesque by Antoine Ringeisen.
- Neuenburg Castle (Guebwiller), town residence of the Fürstabtei Murbach in Guebwiller|Gebweiler in Alsace, 1715-1718.
- St. Trudpert's Abbey: the nave of the abbey church, circa 1715–22, and the conventual buildings, 1738–39.
- Monastery of Ettenheimmünster monastery and church re-construction, from 1718.
- Our Lady of Thierenbach Pilgrimage Church near Jungholtz in Alsace, 1719-1723.
- Königsbrück Abbey: the abbey church, 1721 (no longer extant)
- St. Peter's Abbey in the Black Forest: the abbey church, 1724–1727, and the library, 1737–39
- Monastery Friedenweiler, from 1725.
- Abbey Church of St. Cyriak in Altorf, 1725 (choir and transept), → Altdorf Monastery.
- Ebersmunster Abbey: the abbey church, 1727
- Monastery Church of St. Mary in Frauenalb (municipality of Marxzell), 1727-1733 (preserved as a ruin).
- Günterstal Monastery, 1728 to 1738, outer walls of the monastery buildings preserved.
- Church Monastery St. Margarethen in Waldkirch, 1732-1734.
- Church and priory of Sankt Ulrich im Schwarzwald, 1739-1744.
- Church and priory Mengen, 1741-1744 (church burned down in 1810).
- Pilgrimage Church at Birnau, 1746–50.
- Rectory Bermatingen, 1746-1747.
- St. Peter and Paul (Hilzingen) Parish Church, 1747-1749.
- Pilgrimage church of St. Mary and priory Birnau, 1747-1750.
- House to the Red Dragon Tiergarten pharmacy in Constance, c. 1750
- Catholic parish church in Mundelfingen, 1750-1751.
- Assumption of the Virgin Mary (Tiengen) City Parish Church in Waldshut-Tiengen|Tiengen, 1753-1755
- Abbey of Saint Gall: library, 1757-67
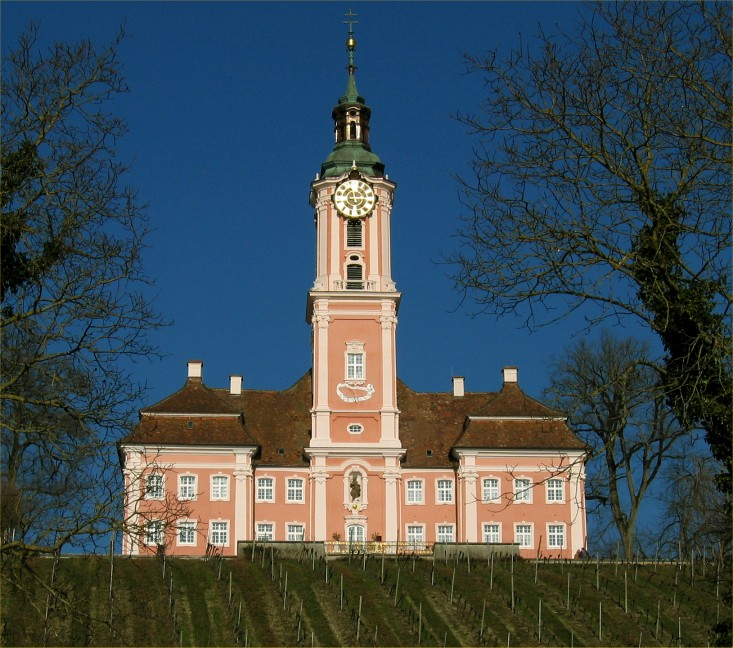
pilgrimage church Birnau

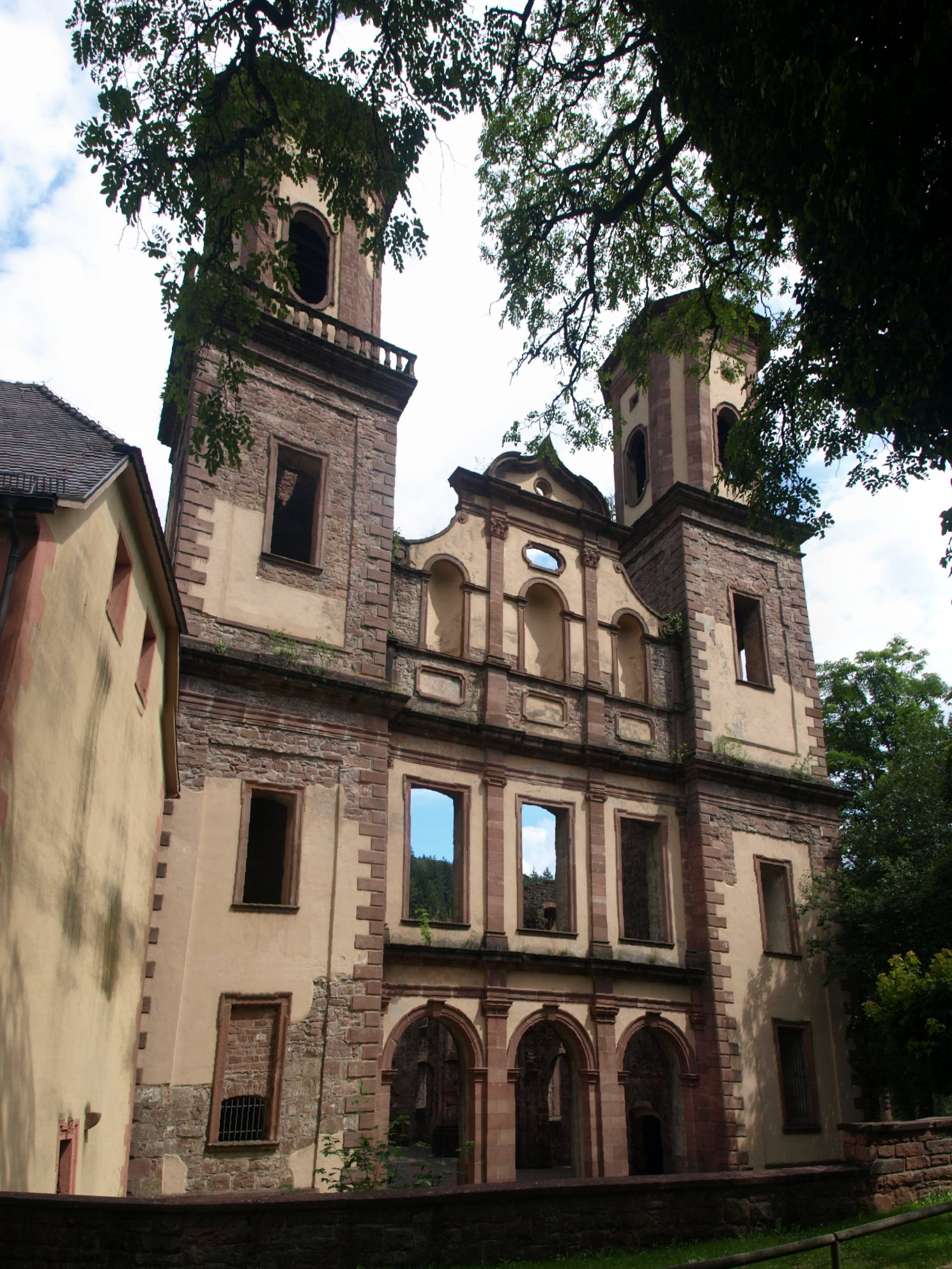
Frauenalb monastery ruins.

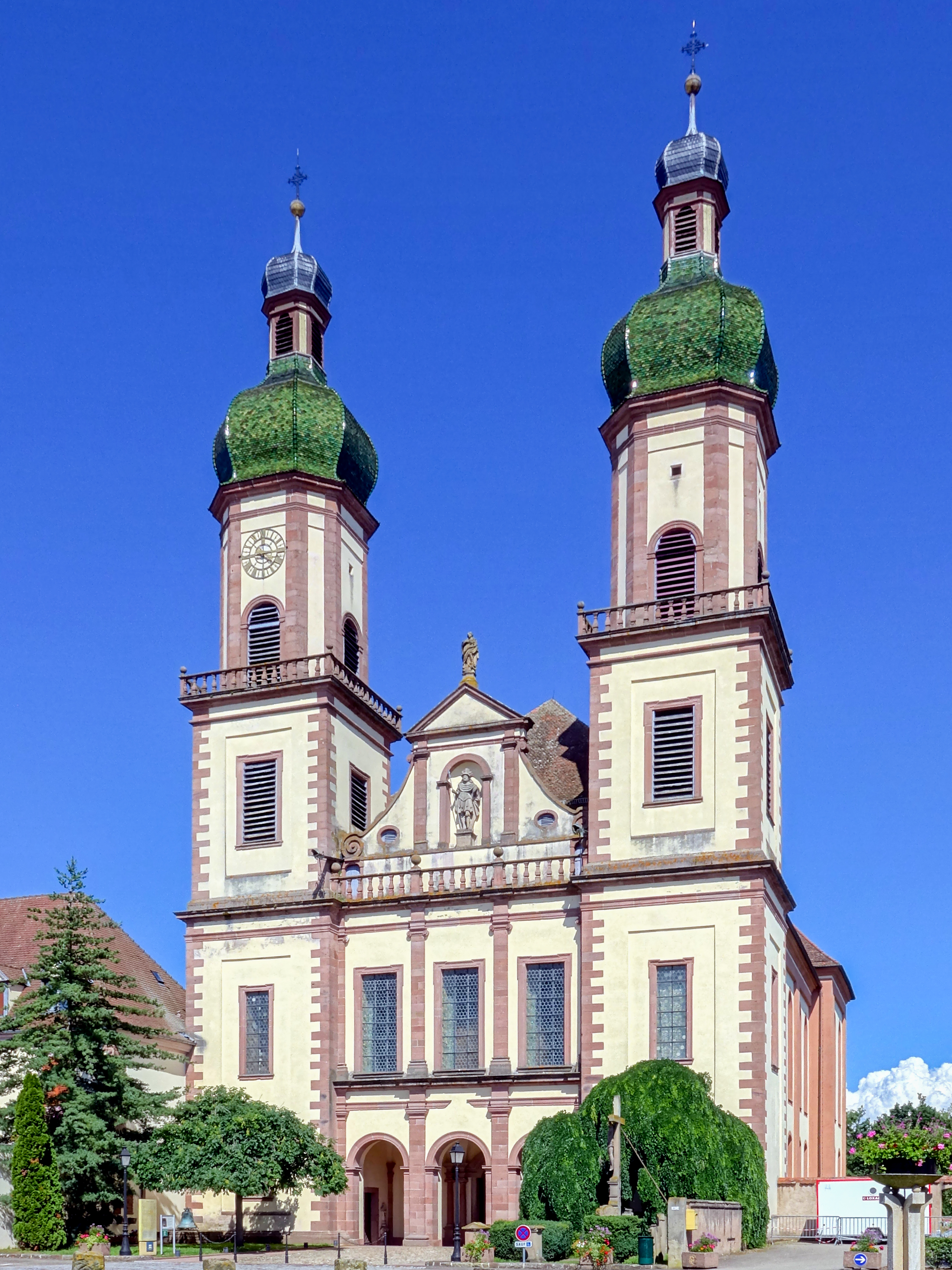
Klosterkirche Ebersmünster

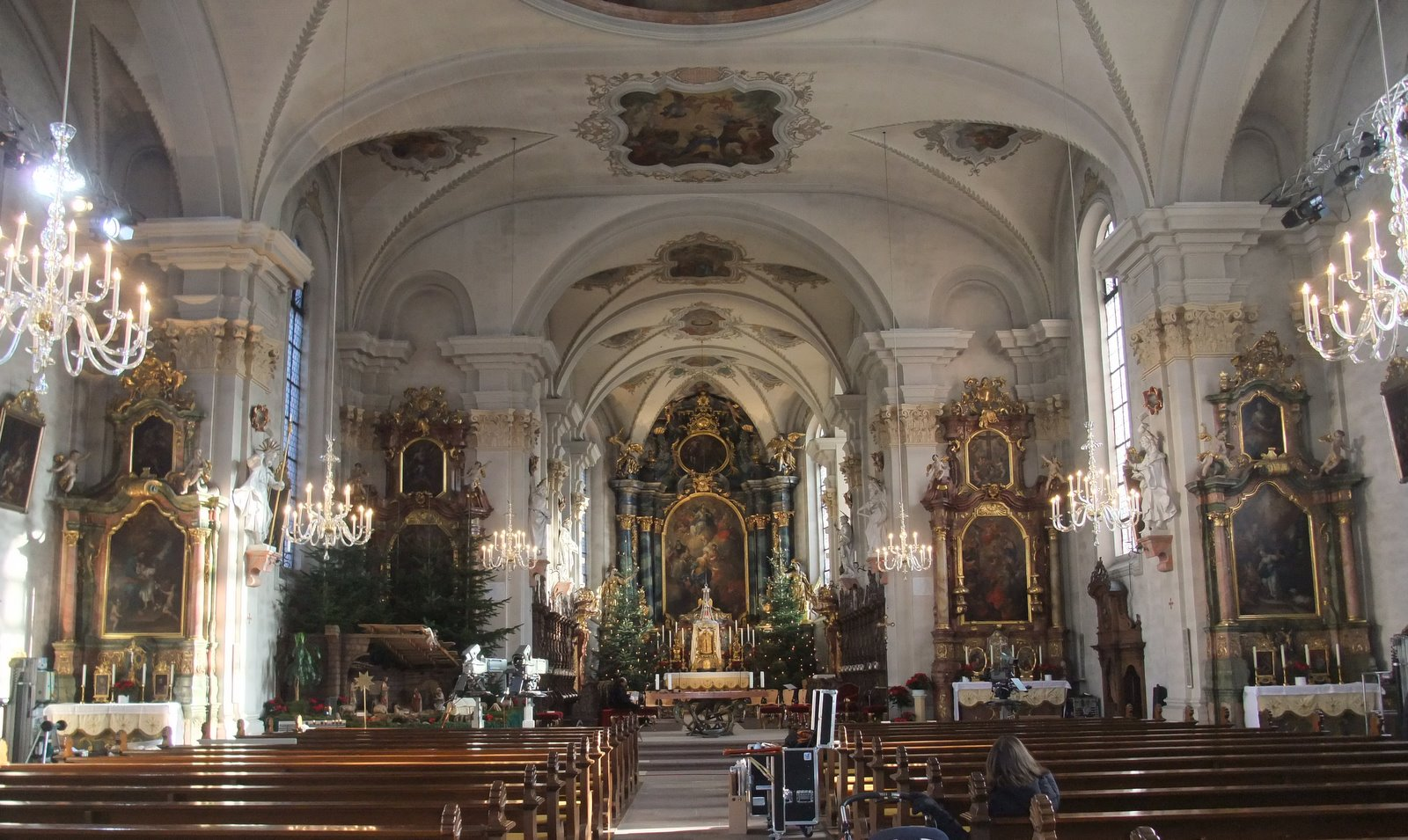
Church nave of St. Margarethen Waldkirch

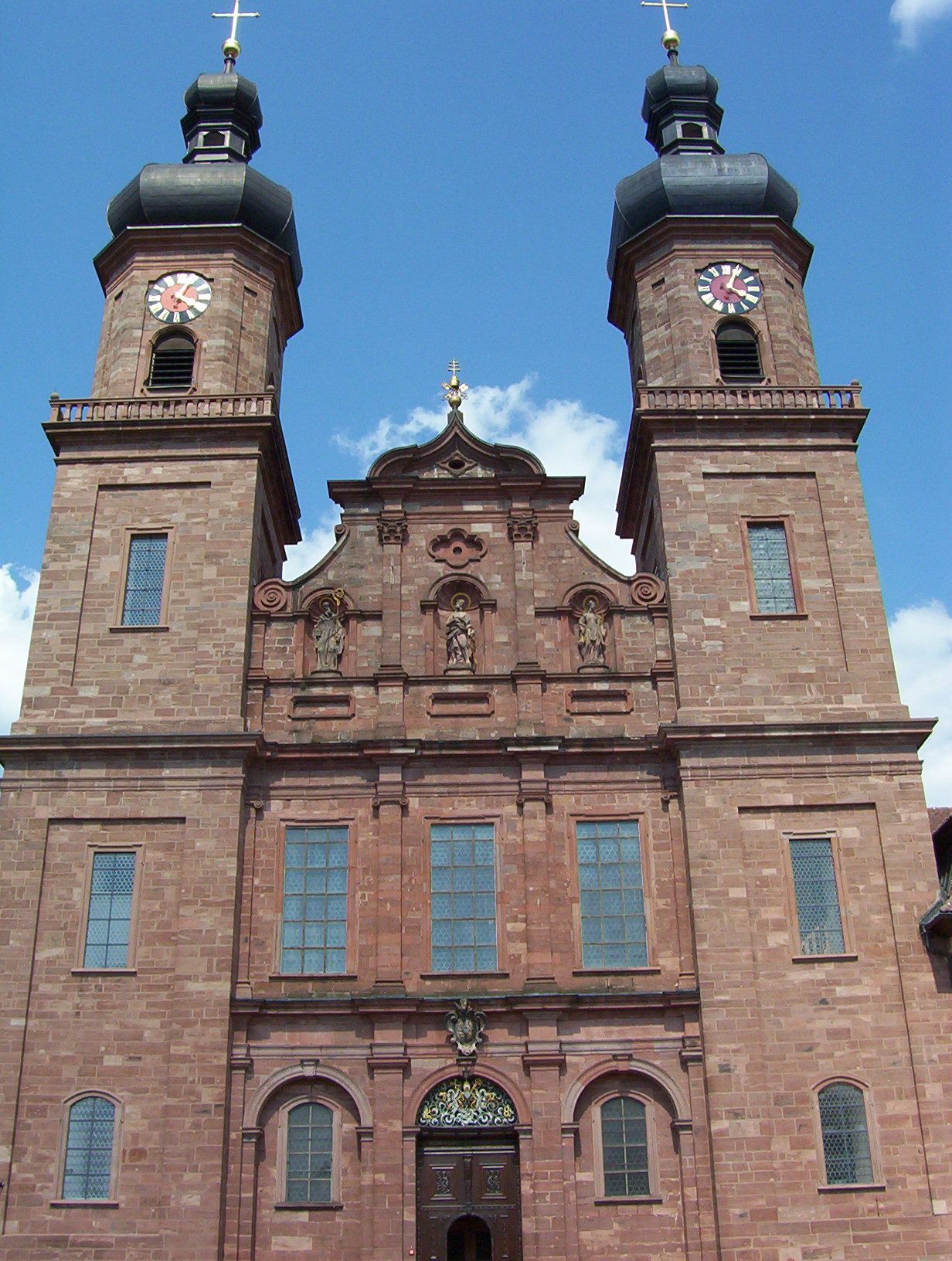
Convent church St. Peter on the Black Forest

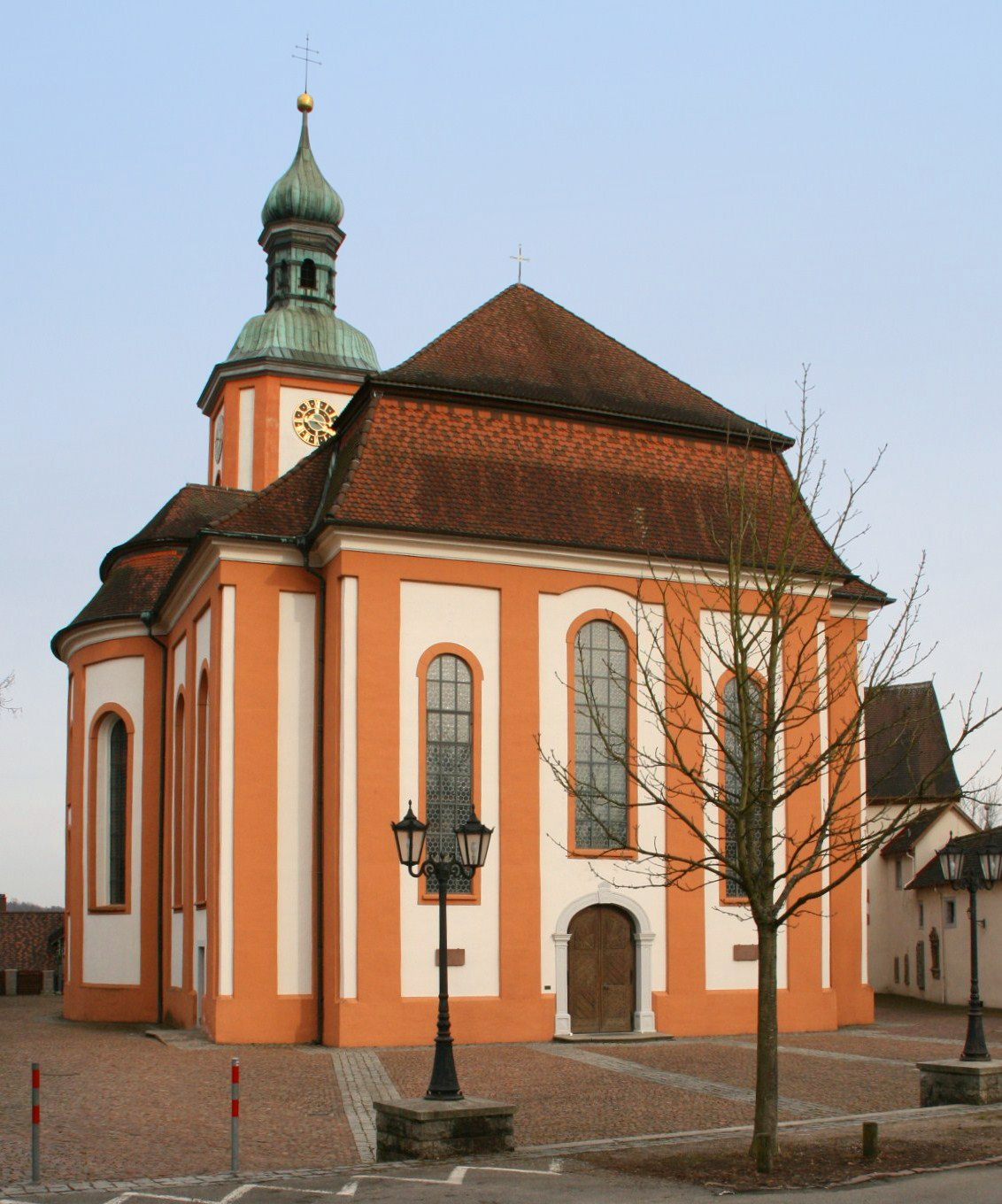
City Parish Church of the Assumption of Mary

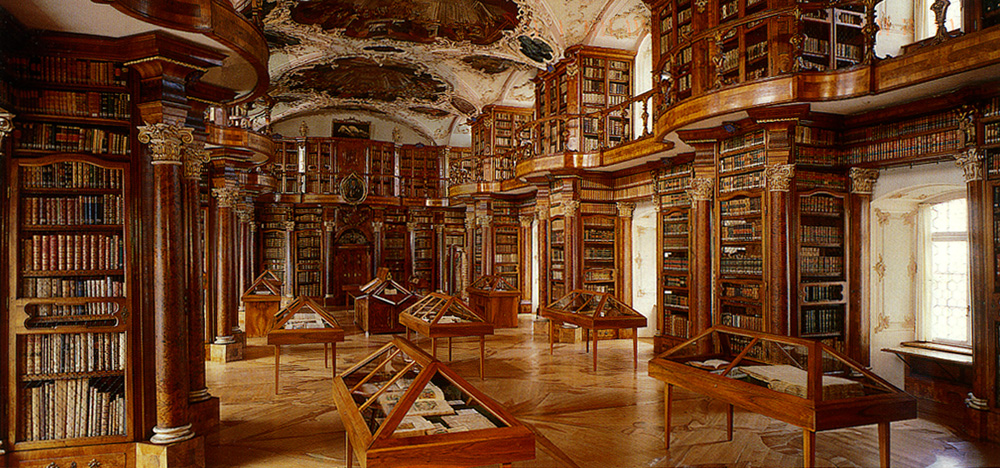
Stiftsbibliothek St. Gallen
