= ADAC Schauinsland Races =

Motor sport event in Germany (1925–1984)

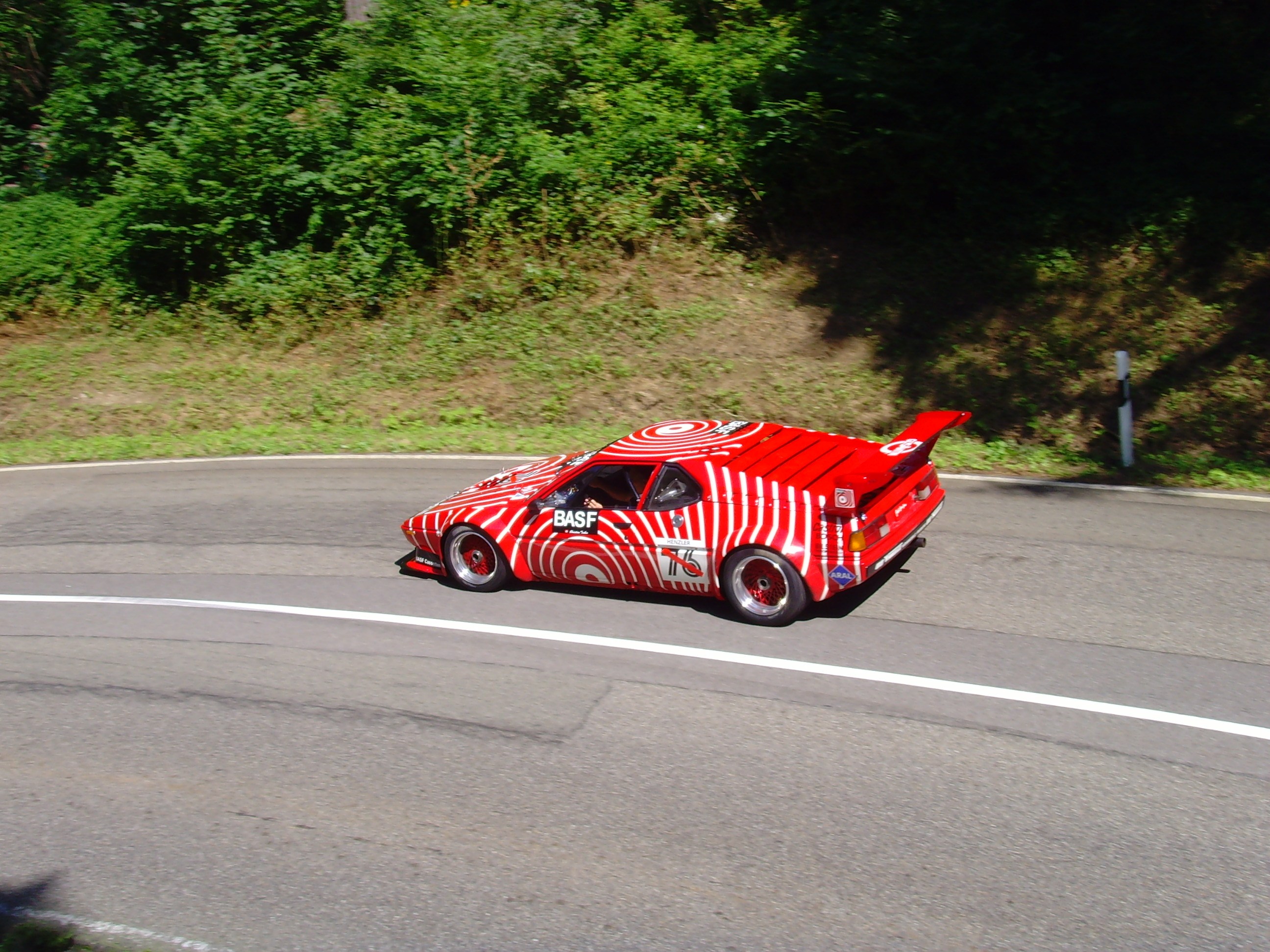
GS Tuning BMW M1 Procar in the 2007 Schauinsland Classic

The ADAC Schauinsland Race was a motor sport event that took place mainly in the borough of Freiburg im Breisgau in south Germany, which took place between 1925 and 1984 on an old logging track, the present day L 124 (Schauinslandstraße), from Horben (today in the county of Breisgau-Hochschwarzwald) to the Schauinsland Pass. The route climbed through 780 metres of height over a course of twelve kilometres. Even today it is the longest and most winding mountain racecourse in Germany and the venue for several European Hill Climb Championships.

== Literature ==
- Henning Volle: Bergrekord am Schauinsland – die Geschichte des berühmten ADAC-Bergrennens 1925–1988. EK-Verlag, Freiburg, 2009, ISBN 978-3-88255-895-1.
