= Schauinslandbahn =

Aerial lift in Germany

Coordinates: 47°56′10″N 7°51′56″E

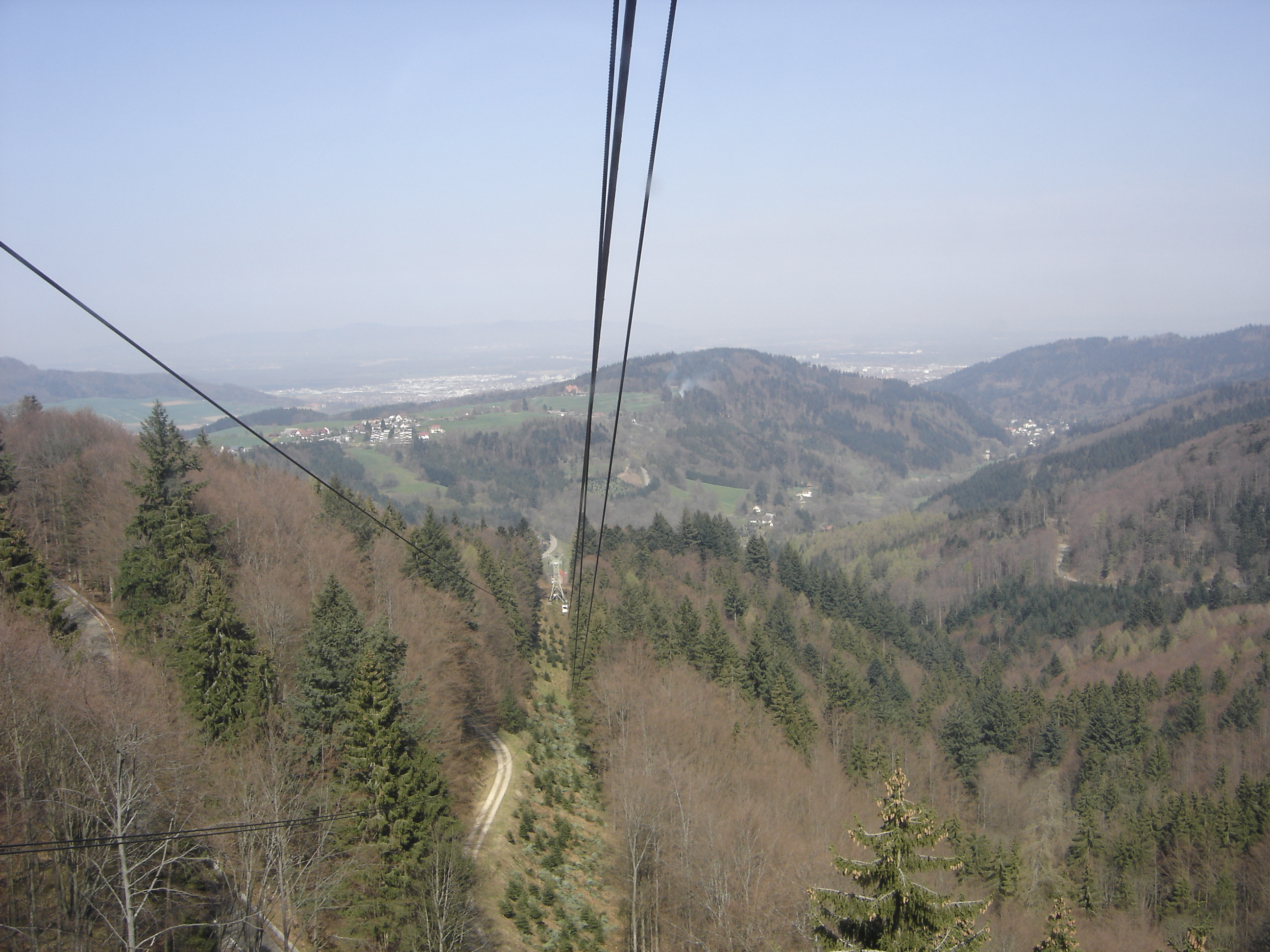
The Schauinslandbahn looking downhill towards Freiburg.

The Schauinslandbahn is a gondola lift in the Black Forest area of Baden-Württemberg, Germany. It links a lower station in the municipality of Horben, near the city of Freiburg im Breisgau, with an upper station near the summit of the Schauinsland mountain. The line is operated by VAG Freiburg, the city transport operator for Freiburg. The same company operates that city's tram and bus network, including bus route 21 that links the lower station of the Schauinslandbahn to the terminus of tram route 2 at Günterstal.

At 3.6 kilometres (2.2 mi) in length, the line is reportedly the longest gondola lift in Germany. It was the first suspended cable car in the world to provide continuous operation of multiple cabins, as opposed to the shuttle style operation of the aerial tramway.

== History ==
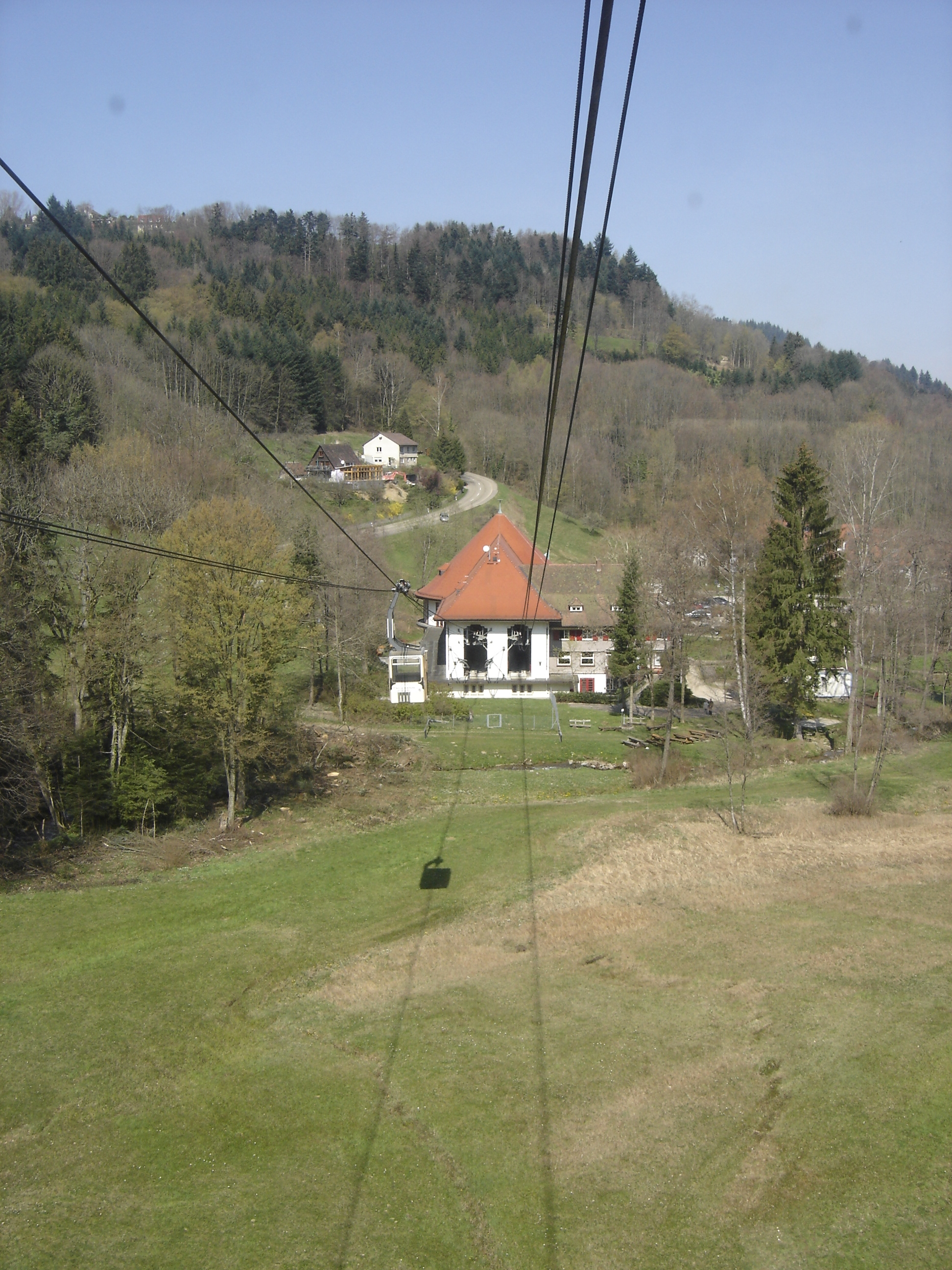
The lower station.

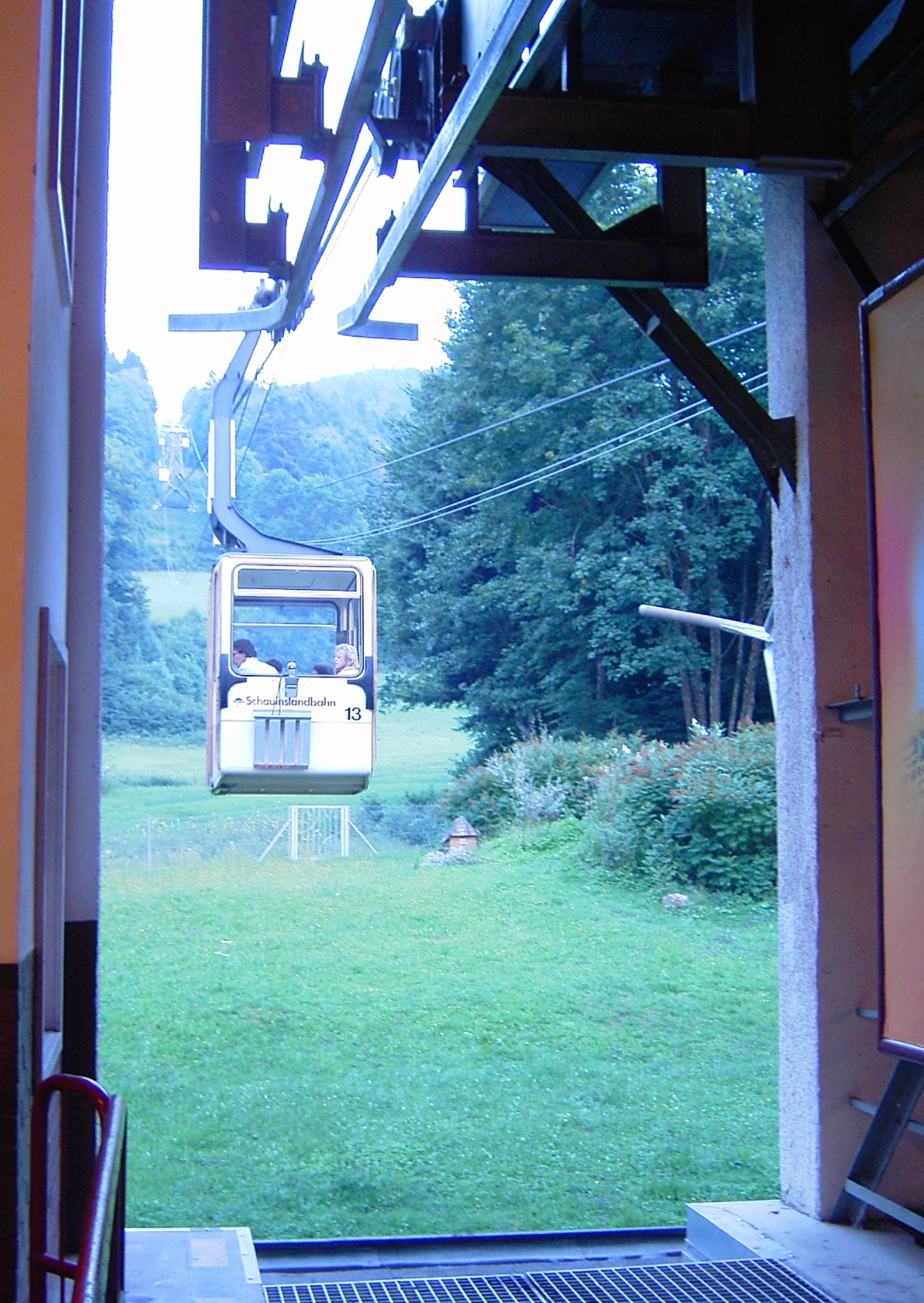
Looking up the line from the lower station.

In the first years of the 20th century, several proposals were made to link Freiburg to Schauinsland. The extension of city tram route 2 on segregated track to Günterstal in 1913 was intended as the first section of a high speed tramway that would connect with a proposed rack railway to the mountain's summit. Other proposals included an aerial cableway, proposed by Professor Georg Benoit of the University of Karlsruhe, and a much longer adhesion railway from Freiburg Hauptbahnhof via Schauinsland to Todtnau. The outbreak of the First World War stopped any further progress on these plans.

After the war it was eventually decided to build a suspended cable car line from a point close to the intended start point of the previously planned rack railway. The line was privately built and owned, opening on 17 July 1930 after three years of construction. It was built to Professor Benoit's design, using one carrying cable and two traction cables. There were 10 cabins, a maximum of 8 of which could be used at any time, and each cabin carried up to 22 passengers and a conductor.

The design of the line involved cabins being attached at the stations onto the cables. In 1932, a mistake by the conductor when hitching the cabin onto the cable led to a cabin dropping 13 metres (43 ft) and killing 2 passengers and the conductor. This led to a major review of the technology and the procedures guiding it; the resulting recommendations were rapidly included in ropeway construction elsewhere, especially in Switzerland.

During the Second World War, the Schauinslandbahn was used to provide transport to military hospitals established on the Schauinsland mountain. Because of the danger of air attack during 1944 and 1945, the line was operated only at night.

The line was acquired by the city of Freiburg in 1968, and merged into VAG in 1982. In 1987, the line closed for modernisation. The original cabins were replaced by 37 smaller cabins that did not require a conductor, thus significantly reducing the number of staff needed to operate the line. During periods of high demand, up to 30 cabins can operate at once, giving a total passenger throughput of more than 500 per hour. Several proposals have been made to complete the originally intended extension of tram route 2 to connect with the Schauinslandbahn, but this has never happened and through passengers still use a connecting bus.

== Operation ==
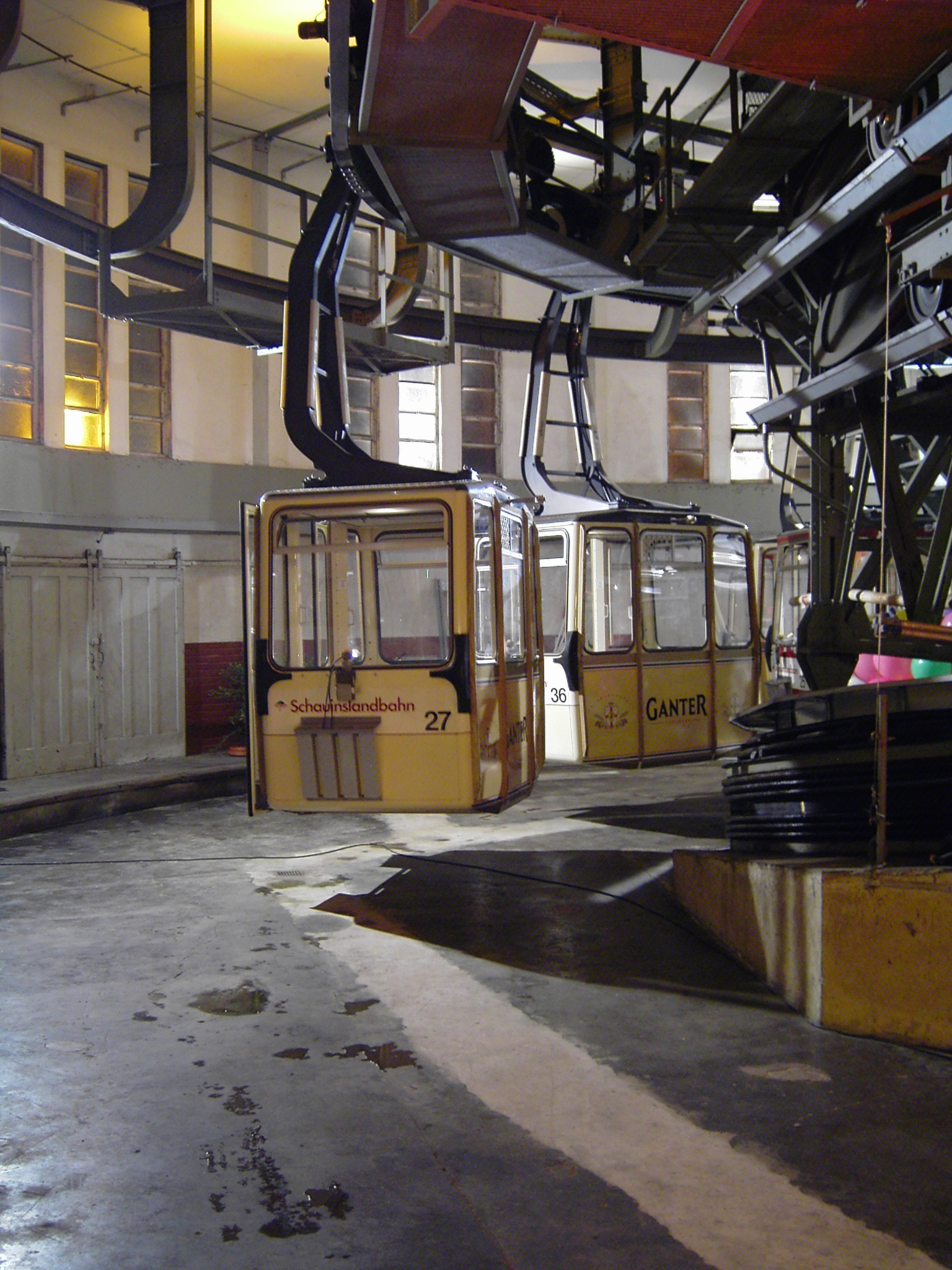
Cabins awaiting passengers in the terminal station.

The line operates seven days a week throughout the year. It runs continuously from 0900 to 1700, with later service from July to September. The line is not included in VAG's normal tram and bus tariff, and the adult return fare is currently €12, with reduced fares for children and families.

The line has the following technical parameters:

- Altitude of lower station: 473 metres (1,552 ft)
- Altitude of upper station: 1,219 metres (3,999 ft)
- Height difference: 746 metres (2,448 ft)
- Length of line: 3,565 metres (11,696 ft)
- Maximum incline: 44.5%
- Average incline: 21%
- Cabins: 37
- Capacity per cabin: 11 passengers
- Hourly capacity: 500/700 passengers
- Journey time: 15 minutes
- Haulage speed: 4 metres per second (13 ft/s)
- Minimum cabin interval: 57 seconds
