= Freiburger Verkehrs AG =

Coordinates: 47.9924°N 7.7971°E

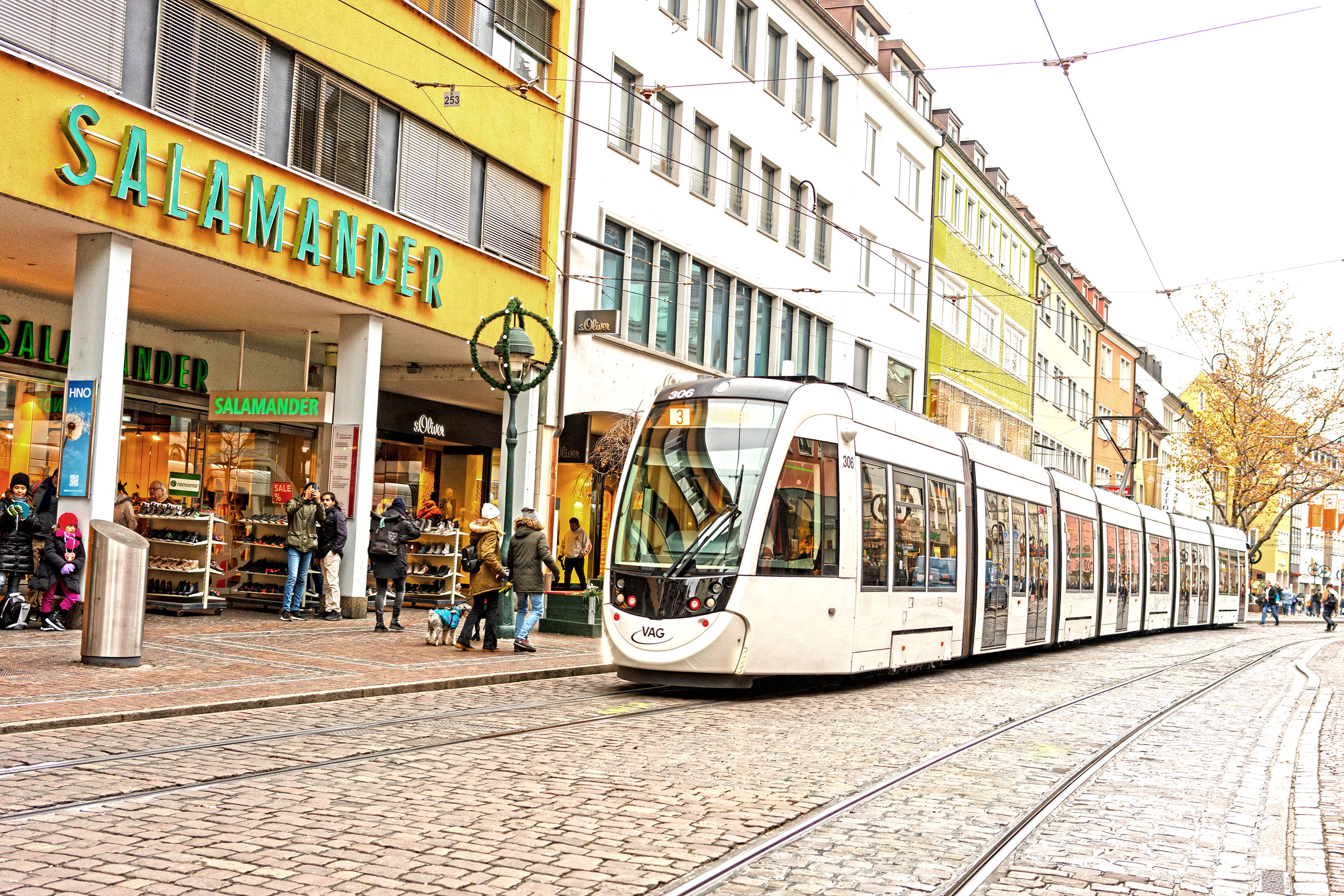
Tram type CAF Urbos3 in Karl-Joseph-Straβe

Logo Freiburger Verkehrs AG

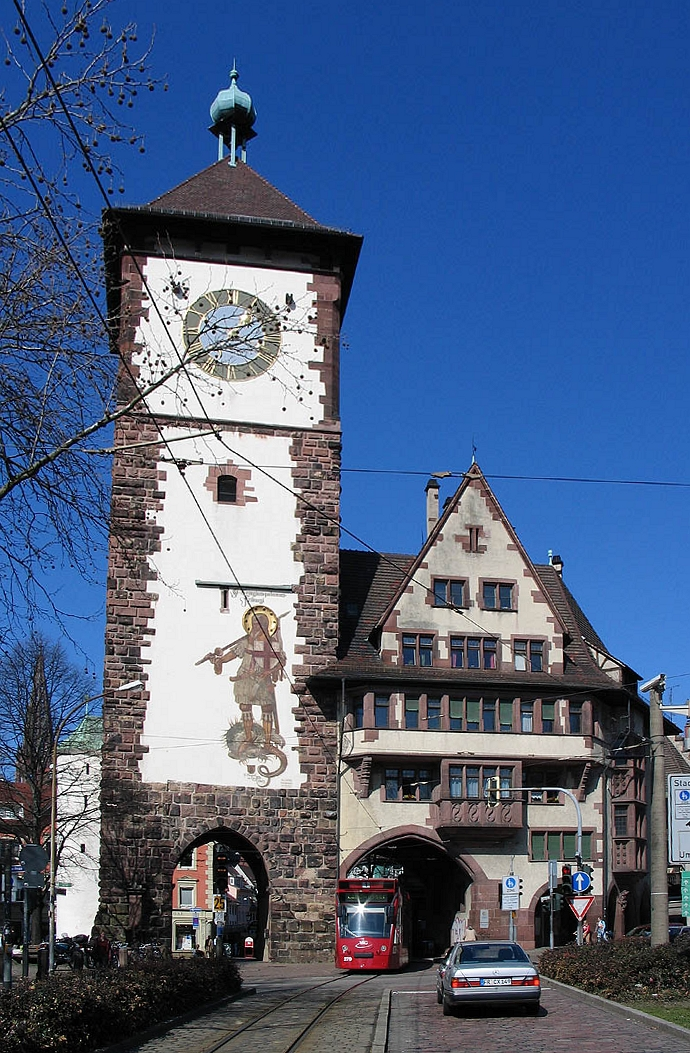
A VAG Combino tram passing through Freiburg's Swabian gate

Freiburger Verkehrs AG, also known as VAG Freiburg or just VAG, is the municipal transport company of the city of Freiburg im Breisgau in Germany and is responsible for operating the local tram network. It is a member of the Regio-Verkehrsverbund Freiburg (RVF), a transport association that co-ordinates public transport in the city of Freiburg and the neighboring districts of Emmendingen and Breisgau-Hochschwarzwald.

Furthermore VAG owns 50% of the shares in the Breisgau S-Bahn, the other 50% are with SWEG. The company operates a regional railway network on DB Netz AG and SWEG owned tracks. The services run on short sections of the Magistrale Upper Rhine Valley Railway, together with the Elztalbahn, Kaiserstuhlbahn and Breisachbahn branch lines.

The VAG is a public limited company, whose shareholder is the city of Freiburg. In 2010 the overall loss was €7.545 million. This was accomplished by a cover ratio of 88%, which is impressively high by German public transport standards.

== History ==
The predecessor of the VAG was the “Direktion des Elektrizitätswerkes und der Straßenbahn”, which was founded on 1 October 1899.

On 14 October 1901 the horse-drawn omnibuses that had existed since 1891 were replaced by the electric tram. The task of the directorate was to provide a stable electricity supply for the trams as soon as possible. This happened with the commissioning of the electricity plant at Eschholzstraße. The power station was taken off the grid in the 1950s and now houses three schools and a cultural centre.

The Directorate became part of the VAG on 1 January 1974. Today, VAG cooperates with the regional energy supplier badenova, a provider which belongs to the Stadtwerke Freiburg.

In October 1970, the company opened the bus depot on the Haid. In 1992, the administration of the historical depot South also moved there. In 1995, shortly after the opening of the tram line to Munzinger Straße on the Haid, the tram workshop and depot moved in. Since then, the depot has been continuously expanded. In 2021, construction began on a 78-metre-long shelter for electric buses. In the summer of 2022, the fleet of electric buses is to be expanded from two to seventeen.

On 1 January 2009, the electricity supply of the Freiburg tram and the Schauinslandbahn was completely switched to green electricity. In 2013, VAG put into operation the first flywheel generator on the Moosweiher in Landwasser, which stores the braking energy of light rail vehicles and transfers it to accelerating railcars. In 2018, the second flywheel generator in Zähringen was inaugurated.

== Network ==
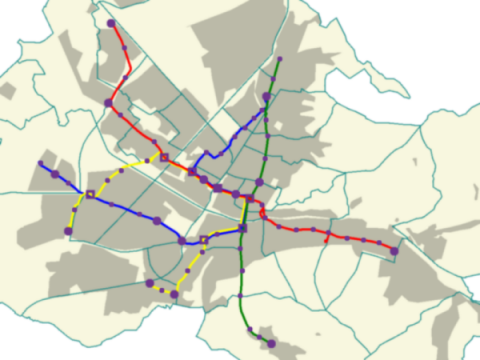
Tram network as of 29 April 2006

VAG operates a network comprising tram lines, bus routes, and a gondola lift. The network carries an average of 200,000 passengers a day. The backbone of the network is based on four tram lines. Coordinated with these are 26 bus lines connecting interchange points to surrounding areas. In addition, the Schauinslandbahn provides access to the summit of Schauinsland mountain.

VAG operates its lines by a fleet of 62 trams and 104 buses. These cover 3.1 and 4.1 million kilometres a year respectively.
Most trams and all buses offer low floor service.
Regular tram intervals are five minutes (line 1) and 7.5 minutes (lines 2,3 and 5) and the bus service intervals depend severely on the line and vary mostly between 10 minutes and 60 minutes.

An extension of tram line 2 (green) of 1.8 km to the border of Gundelfingen in the north was inaugurated and started service on March 15, 2014. An extension of the tramline to the Messe was finished in 2015.

The increasing service quality and quantity increased the number of passengers from 46 million in 1990 to 73 million in 2010. This 58% increase is remarkable whilst the population of the city increased by 23%.

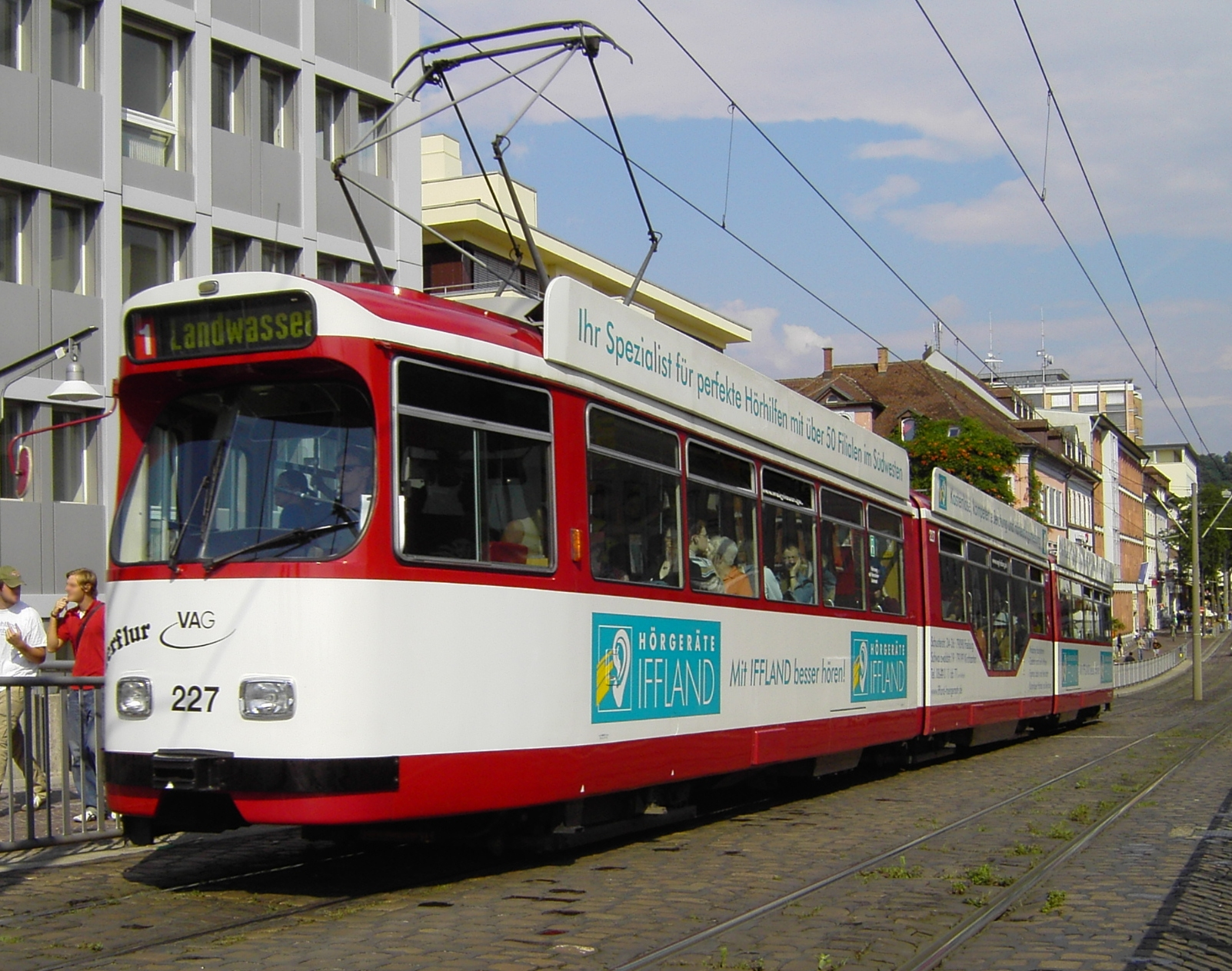
Tram type GT8N at Stühling bridge near central station

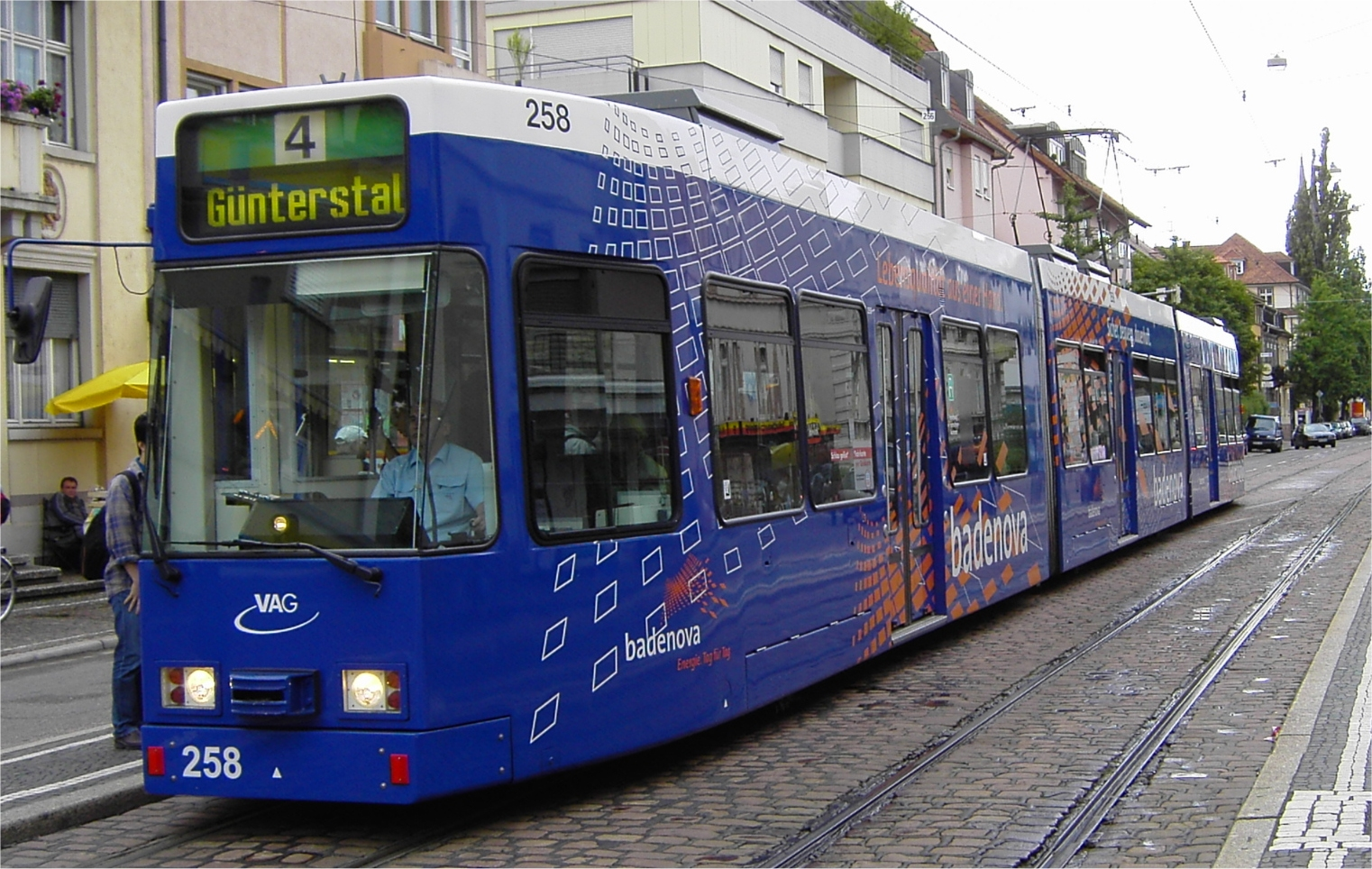
Tram type GT8Z at stop Lorettostraße

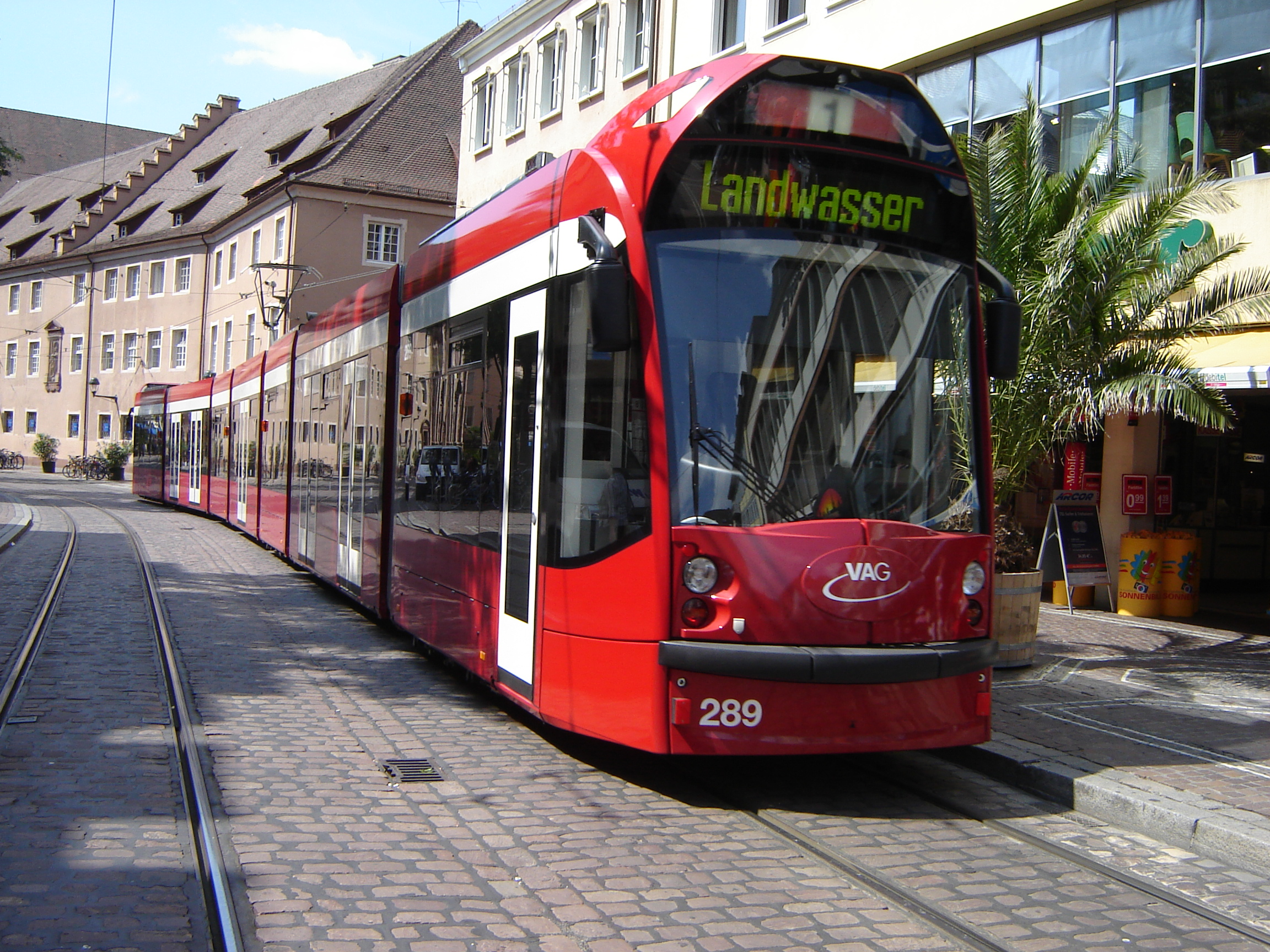
Tram type Combino Advanced at former stop Bertoldsbrunnen

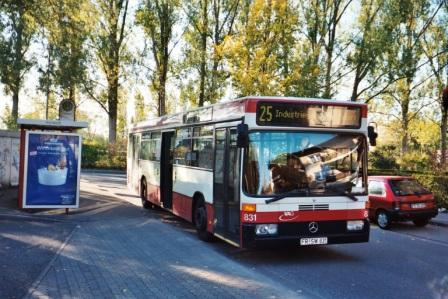
Bus (#831) in Hochdorf

== Night traffic ==
The night service, known as “Safer Traffic”, was operated by seven night bus lines, which operated on Saturday and Sunday nights and before public holidays. These lines, which were named after planets of the Solar System, most recently started at the ZOB at Freiburg Central Station (until 15 March 2014 at the Bertoldsbrunnen) and made it possible to reach the surrounding districts and municipalities almost every hour between 1 and 5 a. m.

Since 14 December 2014, the tram lines (except line 2) are operated every 30 minutes on Saturdays, Sundays and before selected public holidays (from Bertoldsbrunnen from 1 a. m. to 4:30 a. m. ). The night bus lines N46 and N47 supplement the night traffic of the Stadtbahn. Günterstal and more distant villages are additionally reached by taxis, which are available at the transfer stops. The regular RVF fare applies to the Stadtbahn. The night buses N46, N47 and connection taxes cost 4 euros.

In response to the murder of Maria Ladenburger, there has been a women’s night taxi since the end of 2017. Every night from 10 p. m. to 6 a. m., women can use it for all journeys within the city of Freiburg. It costs 7 euros.

== Bibliography ==
- Deacon, Ray (1998). Freiburg: From classic tramway to light rail. Light Rail Transit Association. ISBN 0-948106-22-0.
- Annual report 2010 (in German)
