= Georg Benoit =

Professor of mechanical engineering at the former TH Karlsruhe

- Born: March 3, 1868; Wesel, Germany
- Died: October 20, 1953 (aged 85); Baden-Baden, Germany
- Education: TH Charlottenburg
- Known for: Design of first multi-cabin continuous gondola lift on Schauinsland
- Scientific career
- Fields: Mechanical engineering
- Workplaces: TH Karlsruhe

Georg Benoit (3 March 1868 – 20 October 1953) was a professor of mechanical engineering at the former TH Karlsruhe (today: Karlsruhe Institute of Technology).

== Life ==
Benoit was born in Wesel in 1868. He was raised in a Huguenot family. He studied mechanical engineering at the TH Charlottenburg. After working in the industry sector for a couple of years and serving as director of the Preußische Höhere Maschinenbauschule in Hagen, he was appointed to professorship for elevation and transport machines at the TH Karlsruhe in 1901. This professorship was newly established at that time. He retired in 1935. While being a professor in Karlsruhe, he was appointed to president in 1911/12 as well as in 1921/22. He died in Baden-Baden in 1953.

== Efforts ==
Benoit worked in the field of aerial lifts and wire rope technology. Under his direction, the first gondola lift providing continuous operation with multiple cabins was designed and built. This was mounted in the Black Forest on the Schauinsland mountain and inaugurated in the summer of 1930.

== Works ==
G. Benoit, R. Woernle (1915). Die Drahtseilfrage - Beanspruchung, Lebensdauer, Bemessung von Seilen, insbesondere von Aufzugseilen und ihre experimentelle Erforschung.
