= Horben =

- Municipality
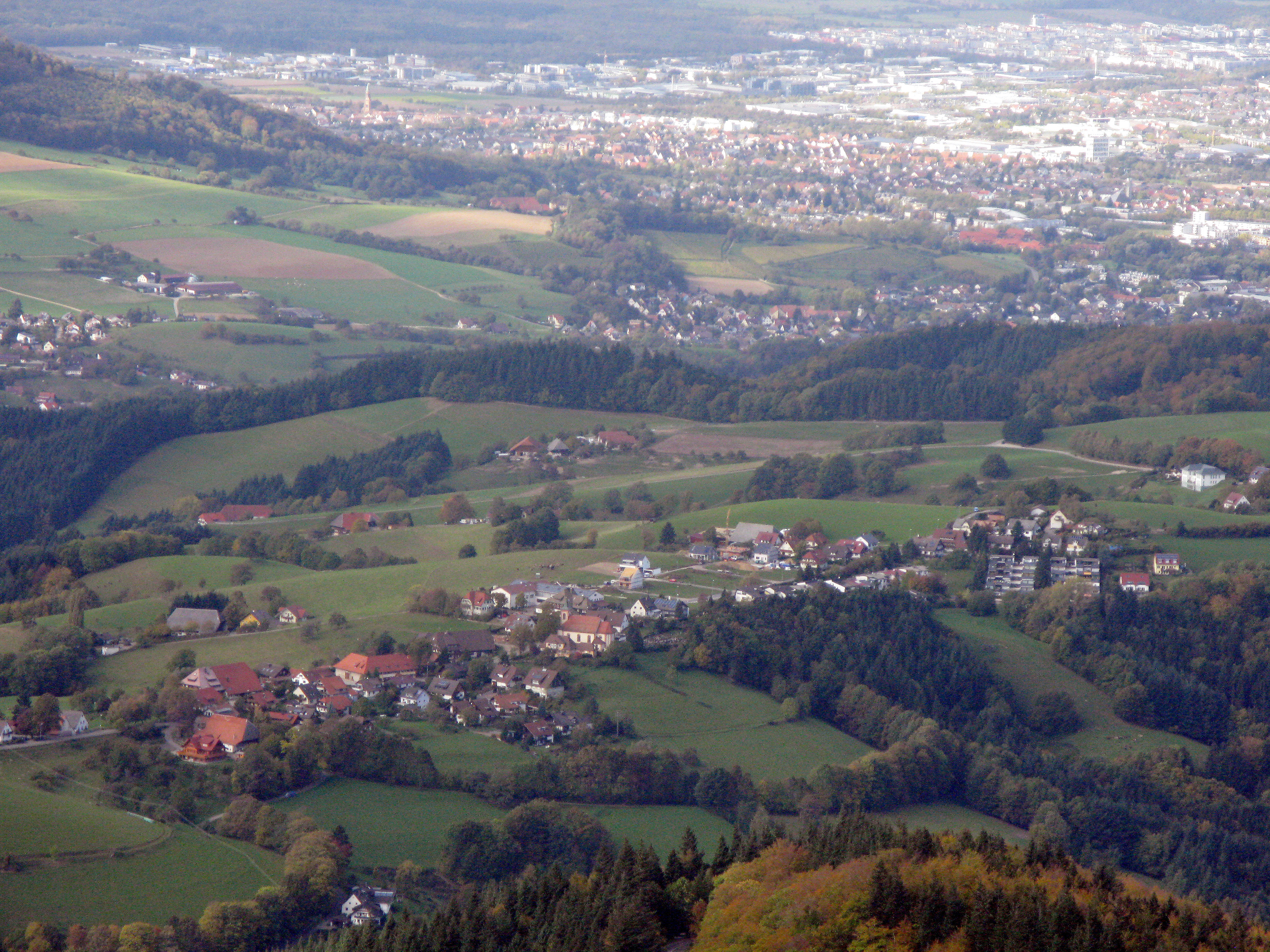
- Horben from the Schauinsland

- Coat of arms

- Location of Horben within Breisgau-Hochschwarzwald district
- Interactive map of Horben
- Location within Germany Location within Baden-Württemberg
- Coordinates: 47°56′06″N 07°51′32″E
- Country: Germany
- State: Baden-Württemberg
- Admin. region: Freiburg
- District: Breisgau-Hochschwarzwald

Government
  - Mayor (2018–26): Benjamin Bröcker

Area
  - Total: 8.75 km^{2} (3.38 sq mi)
- Elevation: 607 m (1,991 ft)

Population (2025-12-31)
  - Total: 1,202
  - Density: 137/km^{2} (356/sq mi)
- Time zone: UTC+01:00 (CET)
  - Summer (DST): UTC+02:00 (CEST)
- Postal codes: 79289
- Dialling codes: 0761
- Vehicle registration: FR
- Website: www.horben.de

Horben is a village in the Breisgau-Hochschwarzwald district in Baden-Württemberg, Germany.

== Geography ==
Horben is located to the south of the city of Freiburg and east of the Hexental valley on the western slope of the Schauinsland mountain range. It lies between the mountains of "Illenberg" (642 m [2,106 ft]) and "Eduardshöhe" (859 m [2,818 ft]). The area is the source of the Bohrer and Selzenbach creeks. Horben lies at an altitude above 400 m (1,300 ft) and is within the Southern Black Forest Nature park. Because of its proximity to the city of Freiburg new housing areas have been developed in the districts Langackern and Bohrer.

=== Climate ===
The average annual temperature at the foothills of the Black Forest is just over 9 °C (48 °F), the rainfalls reach annual average values between 900 and 950 mm (35 and 37 in), in the higher areas up to 1,200 mm (47 in).

== Administration ==
The municipality of Horben includes the village itself and the hamlets of Bohrer, Katzental, Langackern, Münzenried, and Gerstenhalm.

The neighbouring municipalities are the city of Freiburg (in particular its suburb Günterstal) and the municipalities of Au, Wittnau, Sölden and St. Ulrich in the Black Forest. Horben is part of the Municipal association of Hexental of Hexental (de).

=== Municipal council ===
The local elections on 7 June 2009 with a voter turnout of 72.7% had the following result:

Party / Association	Votes	Percentage	Seats
Christian Democratic Union	2,282	41.52%	4
Free Voters	1,373	24.98%	3
Unabhängiges Bürgerforum	851	15.48%	1
Gemeinsam für Horben	990	18.01%	2

== History ==
Horben originally belonged to the tithe district of Wittnau parish, which was ruled the Abbey of Saint Gall in Switzerland. Feudal landlords associated with the abbey, the "Lords of Horwen", are mentioned in 12th century documents and were reported as having a castle on "Horben Mountain". The feudal rights over the village were held by various landlords before being acquired by the city of Freiburg in 1582. However the village was not incorporated into the city then, or since. In 1525 Horben consisted of 24 farms in scattered locations, three houses of widows and an orphanage.

Chief activities during the Middle Ages were mining and forestry. During the Thirty Years' War Horben was pillaged by marauding soldiers. It was reported that not one head of cattle was left in Horben in 1645. The village was later re-settled by farmers from the Bohrer Valley.

In January 1814, during the wars against Napoleon, Russian troops passed through Horben on their way from Freiburg to the Wiese valley.

During the 1848 Baden Revolution Horben was the base of operations of revolutionaries Franz Sigel and Gustav Struve.

The village expanded in the early 20th century, and 1930 saw the construction of the valley station of the Schauinslandbahn gondola lift system.

Horben was untouched by bombing during World War II, though nearby Freiburg was devastated, and at the end of the war the area was occupied by French troops.

After the war many refugees found a new home in the village. Since then development pressure from Freiburg increased and in Horben village, Bohrer and Langackern large areas have had new houses built.

== Landmarks ==
Local landmarks include the Althäusle dower house, pre-dating 1600, the Zum Raben guesthouse, dating from 1604, and the parish church of St Agatha, from 1792.

== Economy ==
The main economic activities are forestry, part-time agriculture (de) and tourism; in 2009 Horben recorded 25,000 overnight stays.

== Infrastructure and traffic ==
Horben holds the base station for the Schauinslandbahn gondola lift system.
