= Wittnau, Baden-Württemberg =

Wittnau
- Municipality
- Coat of arms

- Location of Wittnau within Breisgau-Hochschwarzwald district
- Interactive map of Wittnau
- Location within Germany Location within Baden-Württemberg
- Coordinates: 47°56′45″N 7°48′53″E
- Country: Germany
- State: Baden-Württemberg
- Admin. region: Freiburg
- District: Breisgau-Hochschwarzwald
- Subdivisions: 2

Government
  - Mayor (2018–26): Jörg Kindel

Area
  - Total: 5.04 km^{2} (1.95 sq mi)
- Elevation: 378 m (1,240 ft)

Population (2025-12-31)
  - Total: 1,483
  - Density: 294/km^{2} (762/sq mi)
- Time zone: UTC+01:00 (CET)
  - Summer (DST): UTC+02:00 (CEST)
- Postal codes: 79299
- Dialling codes: 0761
- Vehicle registration: FR
- Website: www.wittnau.de

Wittnau is a community in the district of Breisgau-Hochschwarzwald in Baden-Württemberg in Germany.

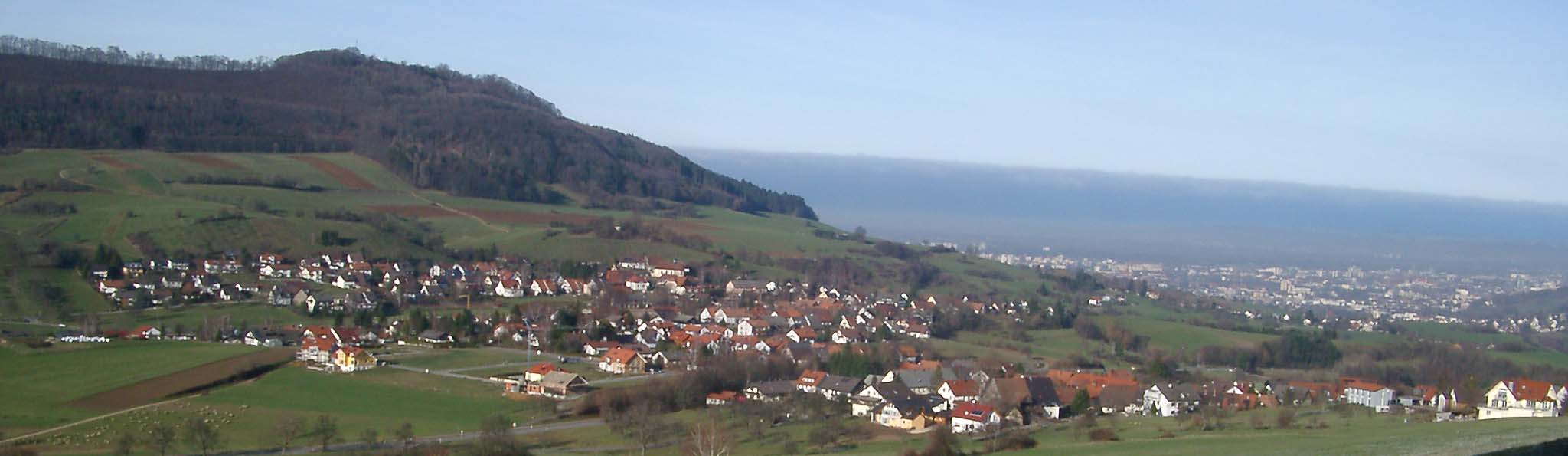
The municipality of Wittnau am Schönberg, with Freiburg in the background
