= Schauinsland =

Mountain in the Black Forest, Germany

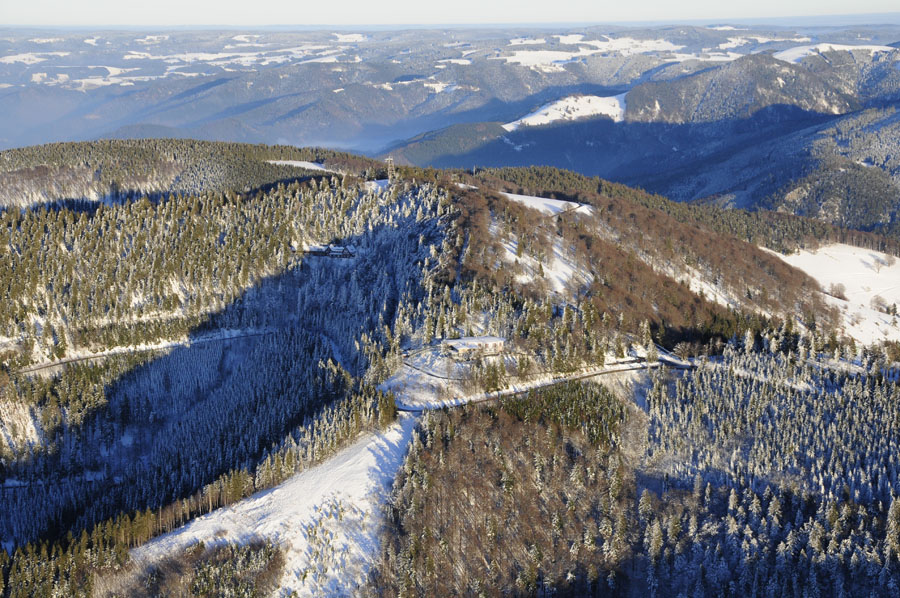
- Schauinsland, 2007

Highest point
- Elevation: 1,284 m (4,213 ft)
- Coordinates: 47°54′43″N 7°53′55″E

Naming
- English translation: Look into the country
- Language of name: German

Geography
- Location within Baden-Württemberg
- Location: Baden-Württemberg, Germany
- Parent range: Black Forest

The Schauinsland (German pronunciation: [ˈʃaʊʔɪnsˌlant]; literally "look-into-the-country"; near Freiburg im Breisgau, Germany) is a mountain in the Black Forest with an elevation of 1,284 m (4,213 ft) above sea level. It is a popular destination for day trips. Due to the high amount of silver mining, it was previously known as "Erzkasten" (literally "ore box"); the name "Schouwesland" first appeared in 1347. The mountain is located roughly ten kilometres (6.2 miles) south-east of Freiburg's city centre.

== Geography ==
The summit of the Schauinsland is located in the district of Freiburg. The mountain is surrounded by towns such as Oberried, Munstertal, Bollschweil, and Horben (clockwise). The closest village to the summit is Hofsgrund. In Autumn especially, during a temperature inversion, there is a clear view of the Vosges mountains from the top of the Schauinsland. Under appropriate weather conditions there is a view of a large portion of the Swiss Alps.

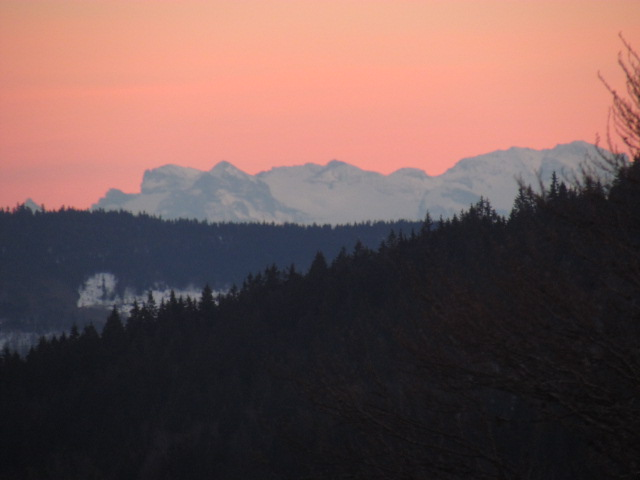
The Swiss Alps as seen from the Schauinsland

Since 2003, the Holzschlägermatte on the Schauinsland has been home to a number of very controversial wind turbines. Due to conservation issues (the summit of the Schauinsland is part of a nature reserve), they were constructed at an elevation of roughly 1,000 metres (3,300 feet) above sea level instead of on the summit. Therefore, the view to and from the summit is only slightly restricted. During the lawsuit against the operating company, the Freiburg-based artist Richard Schindler wrote an expert report which is considered the first of its kind.

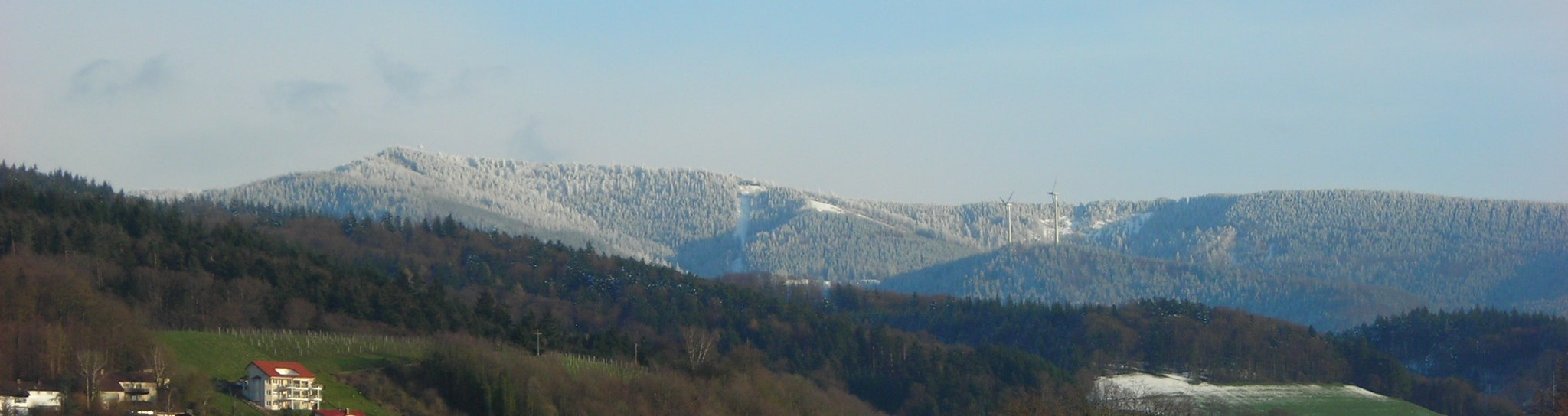
The Schauinsland with its wind turbines as seen from Freiburg

== History ==
=== Mining ===
For over 700 years, silver, lead and zinc were mined from the Schauinsland. In the Middle Ages, mining was very productive, so much so that in the 14th century a number of contractors of the Dieselmuot mine could afford to donate glass windows to the Freiburg Minster. The miners lived right next to the mines on the Schauinsland in two settlements, which were abandoned during the 16th century. The silver obtained was traded and used for minting coins. The mining tunnels are spread over 22 levels and amount to a total of about 100 kilometers (62 miles). At the beginning of the 20th century, about 250 miners were employed in the Schauinsland mines. Production ceased in 1954 due to the mine not yielding enough economy.

==== Kapplerstollen ====
There is a tunnel, the so-called Kapplerstollen, which connects the villages Kappel and Hofsgrund. It is also referred to as "midwife's tunnel" due to the fact that around the end of the 19th century midwives, as well as the children of Kappel, used it as a shortcut to Hofsgrund.

The tunnel still exists, however, its entries are no longer accessible.

Since 1975, the Barbarastollen, a reconstructed part of the mine, has been used by the Federal Office for Civil Protection and Emergency Aid as a storage facility for Germany's archived materials. The tunnel is Europe's largest long-term archive.

==== Mining museum ====
The research team Steiber, founded in 1976, cleared and surveyed several old parts of the mine. A part of an old ore mine has been transformed into a museum that has been open to the public since 1997. On tours, visitors are shown a wide range of medieval tunnels and shafts from the final stages of when the mine was in operation.

=== Schauinsland Race ===
Between 1923 and 1984, a legendary hillclimb race called the "ADAC Schauinsland-Rennen" took place on the Schauinslandstraße. The 12 km (7.5 mi) long route winds its way up public roads from Horben over the Holzschlägermatte to the cable car station at the top of the mountain. Since 2000, this traditional motorsport event has taken place on a shortened route up to the Holzschlägermatte, but only as a parade for classic cars. Since 1984, the Schauinslandstraße has been shut for motorcyclists between 1 April and 1 November, as well as at weekends and on public holidays.

=== Schauinslandkönig (Schauinsland King) ===
Since 2007, there has been a hillclimb event on the L-124- "race course" from Horben to the chairlift station. It attracts over 1,000 participants a year, including racing cyclists, but also bikes with the capacity to tow children, tandem bikes, unicyclists, handicapped riders, inline skaters and roller skiers. They climb the so-called Schauinslandkönig (Schauinsland King) which is a distance of 11.5 km (7¼ miles) with a 770 metres (2,530 feet) climb.

=== Berghaus (Mountain House) ===
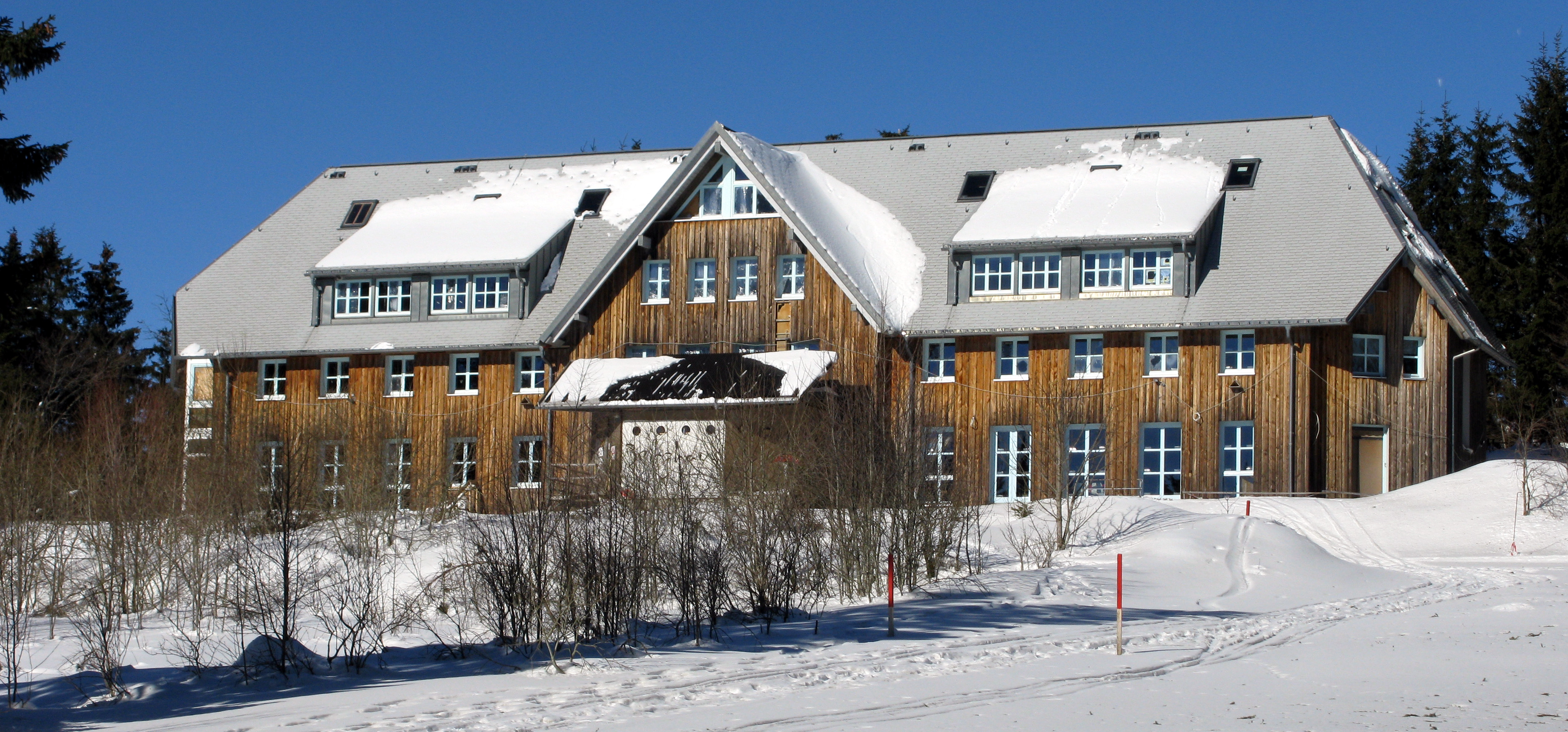
The Berghaus

In 1936, a hotel with 26 rooms and 74 beds was built on the mountain. This was used by the French Commandant from the end of the war to 1952. In 1958, it was used as a children's recreation centre and later as a halls of residence building for the town of Pforzheim. In 1989, it was used by the town of Freiburg as a home for refugees up until 1992 when it was used as a student halls of residence. A doctor from the Groddeck Hospital then tried to convert the building into a 48-bed rehabilitation centre, but this failed due to changes in health legislation and lack of credit. This led to its bankruptcy in late 2000. The building was empty from 2001 and the new doors and windows were vandalised. In 2011, the Berghaus was acquired by three couples from Freiburg, who wanted to convert the building into a conference centre and holiday home in the spring of 2015. They were supported in this endeavour by members of the Service Civil International. However, the project did not find enough support and the house is now due to be sold again.

=== Mountain hotel ===
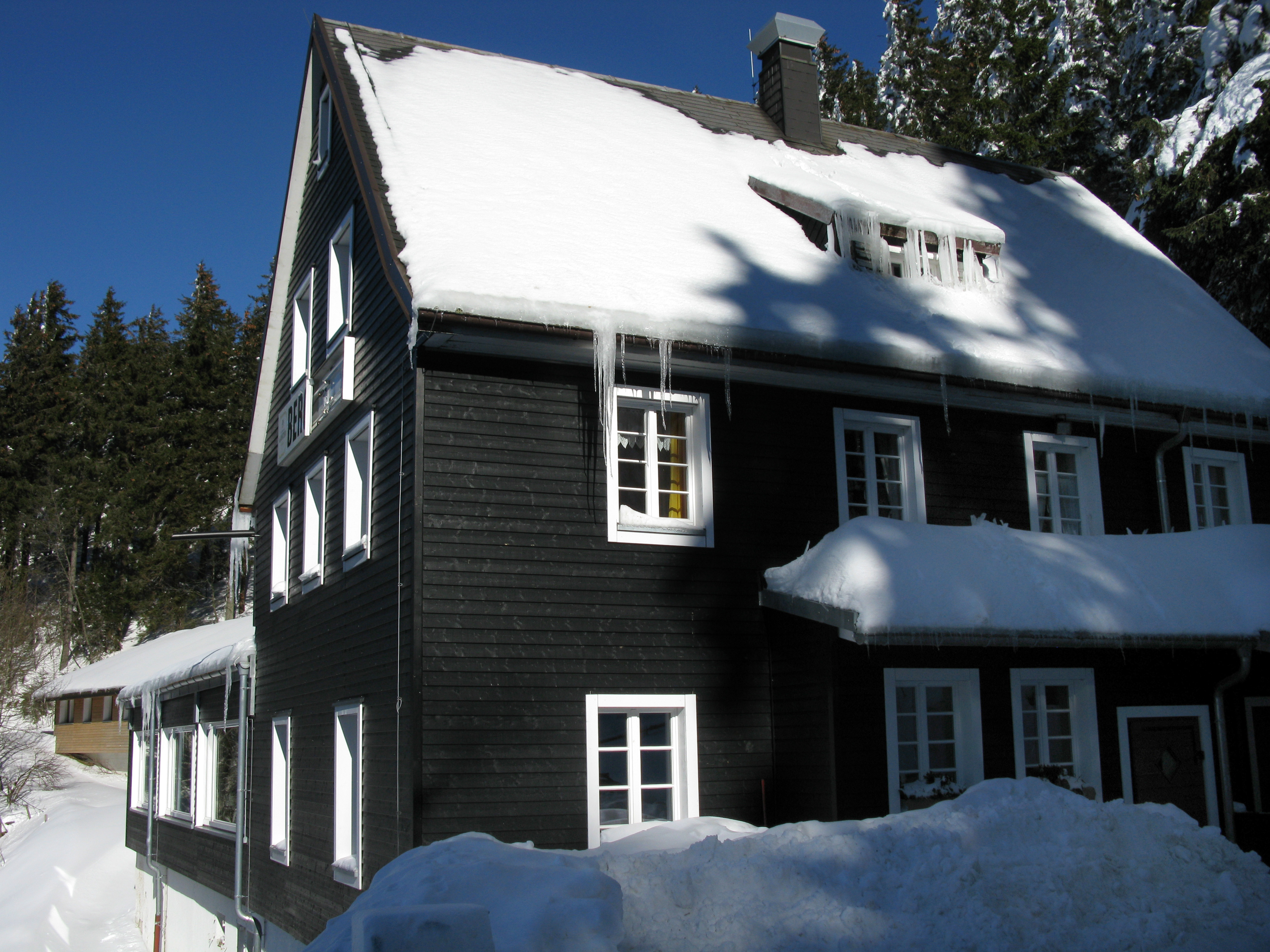
Berghotel Schauinsland

In 1869, the stage manager of the municipal theater in Freiburg built and ran a cottage to the south-west of the peak. After various changes, the guest house "Zur Friedrichsruhe" emerged, also known as "Berghotel Schauinsland" (mountain hotel Schauinsland). After a fire in 1926, the house was reconstructed to its current form. From 1936 to 1982, Heinrich Sauerer ran the mountain hotel together with his family. Afterwards, the workers' welfare union ran the guesthouse as a conference and meeting place for groups for thirteen years. As of 2006, the house, including 50 beds, can be fully rented. It is also the location of a detective novel.

== Protected areas ==
As of 12 December 2002, the Schauinsland's summit and the surrounding areas are protected by the regional council as a nature reserve (NSG number 3.264) within the natural environment of the High Black Forest. It encompasses an area of almost 1,054 hectares (2,600 acres), whereby 329.7 hectares (815 acres) are part of Freiburg im Breisgau and 724.2 hectares (1,790 acres) are part of the rural district Breisgau-High Black Forest. It is classified in the fourth IUCN category. The CDDA code is 319058. The nature reserve is supplemented by a conservation area of the same name, which has also been documented in the bylaw of December 2002. It incorporates the "Freiburger Bergwald" at the north-west slope of the Schauinsland, the "Kappler Tal" with a small and a big valley at the district of Kappel, the countryside south-west of "Brugge" and west of the L126 between "Kirchzarten-Bruckmühle" and the "Hohen Brücke" by St. Wilhelm, the countryside south-west of the "Trubelmattkopf" to the "Widener Eck" and east of the "Stampfbachtal" from "Oberneuhof" to "Spielweg" at the district of "Obermünstertal", as well as the meadows at the "Kohlerhöfen" in the district of "Ehrenstetten" within the nature reserve. Altogether, the landscape conservation area spans 5,484 hectares (13,550 acres), of which 1,741 hectares (4,300 acres) can be attributed to the urban district of Freiburg (under the number 3.11.008) and 3,743 hectares (9,250 acres) can be attributed to the rural district Breisgau-High Black Forest (under the number 3.15.032).

== The "Engländerdenkmal" (Englishmen Memorial) ==
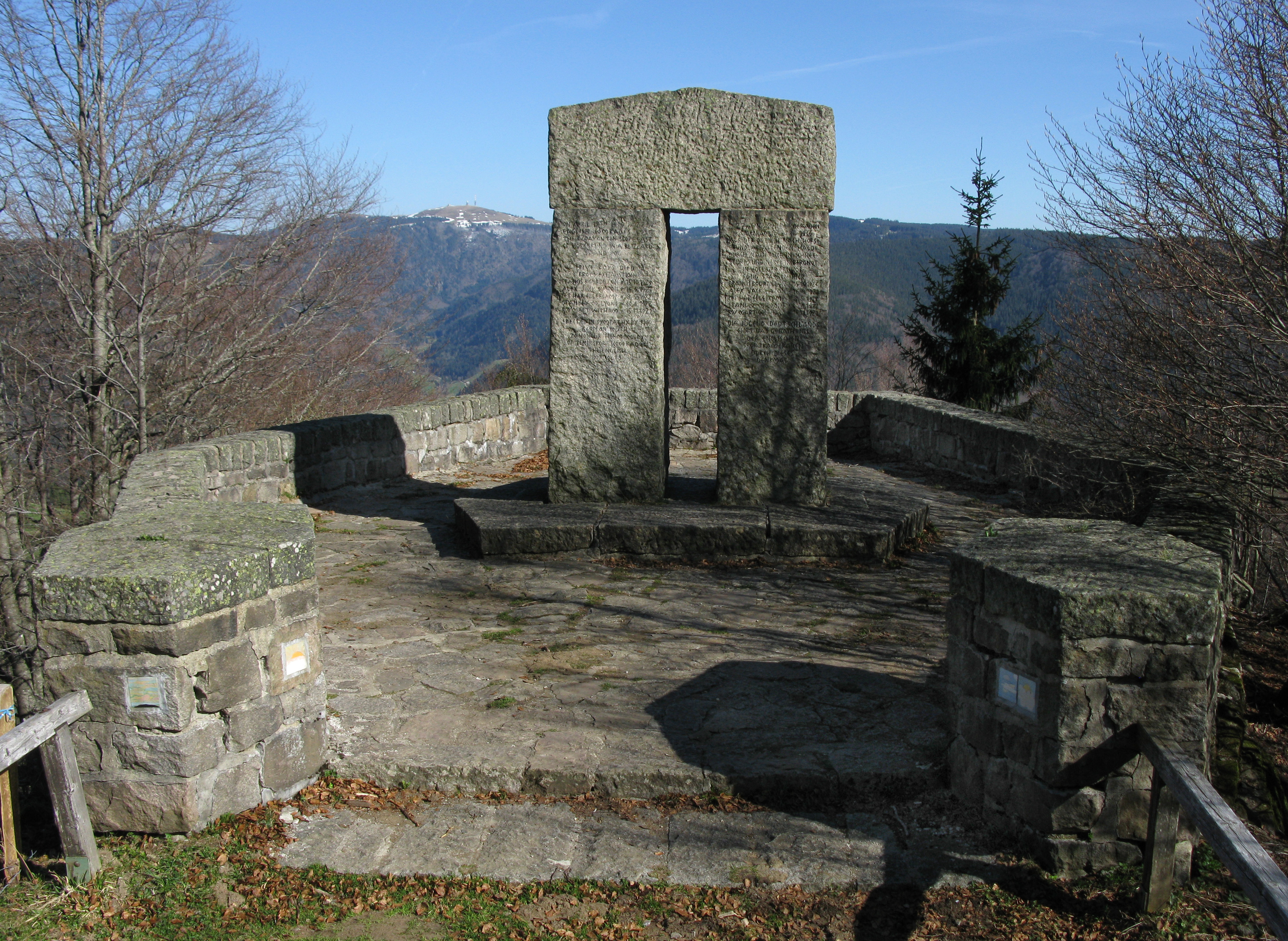
The "Engländerdenkmal"

On 17 April 1936, a group of English students from the Strand School, along with their teacher Kenneth Keast, hiked up Schauinsland, attempting to reach Todtnauberg. Severe weather had been predicted, and the group was inadequately equipped and clothed. It was already snowing when they left Freiburg, and after several local people advised Keast not to, they went on. Just short of the summit, they were engulfed in a blizzard. Hours later, part of the group finally made it to Hofsgrund, from where a search party immediately set off to rescue the scattered group from storm and darkness. Four of the group of 27 were frozen to death or had died from exhaustion, and another one was critical and died on the following day. This is locally known as the "Engländerunglück", literally "Englishmen’s calamity".

In 1938 architect Hermann Alker from Karlsruhe erected a memorial for the dead English students, which became a significant site for the Hitler Youth who used the monument for the purpose of propaganda.

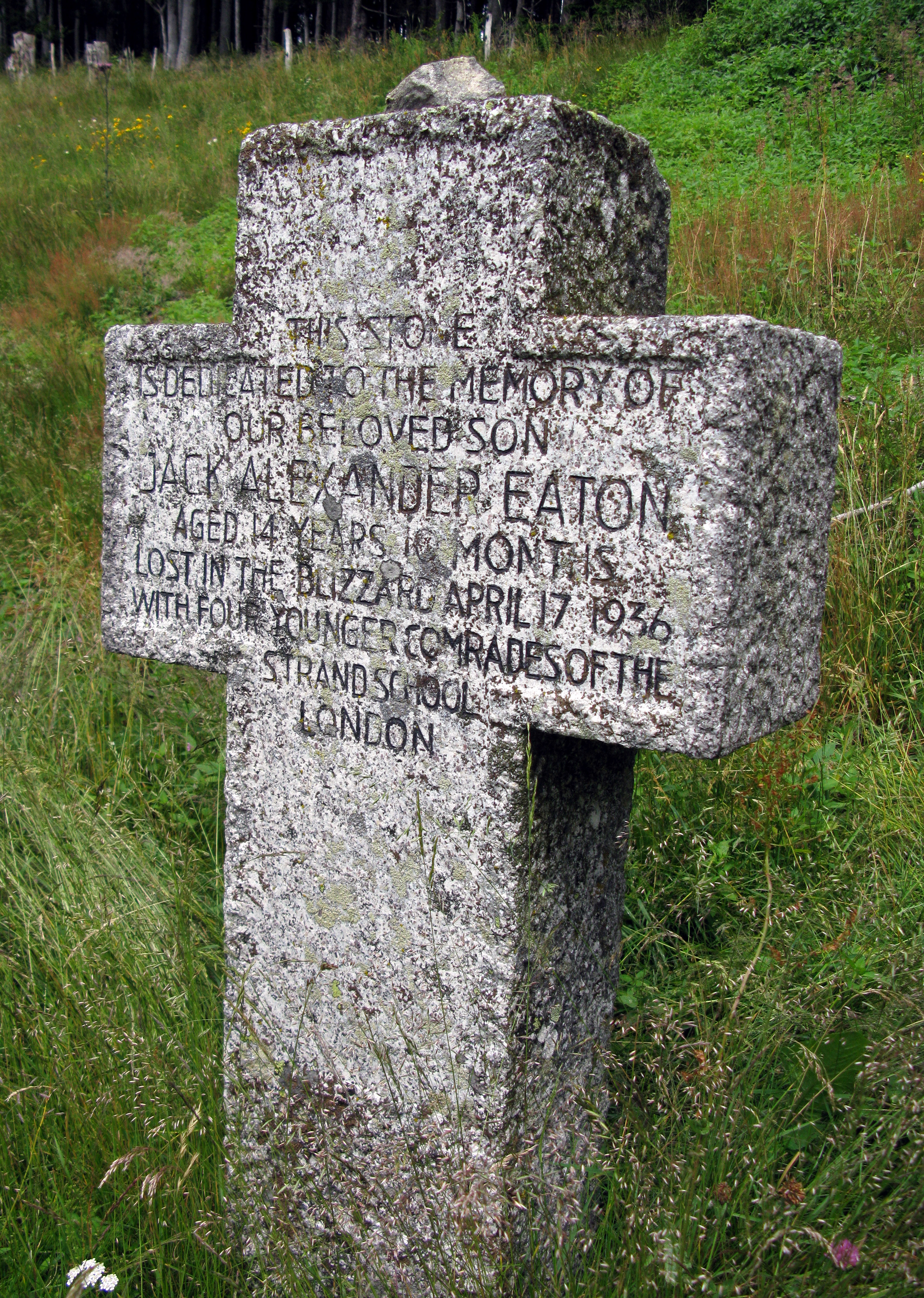
Eaton cross

== Observatories ==
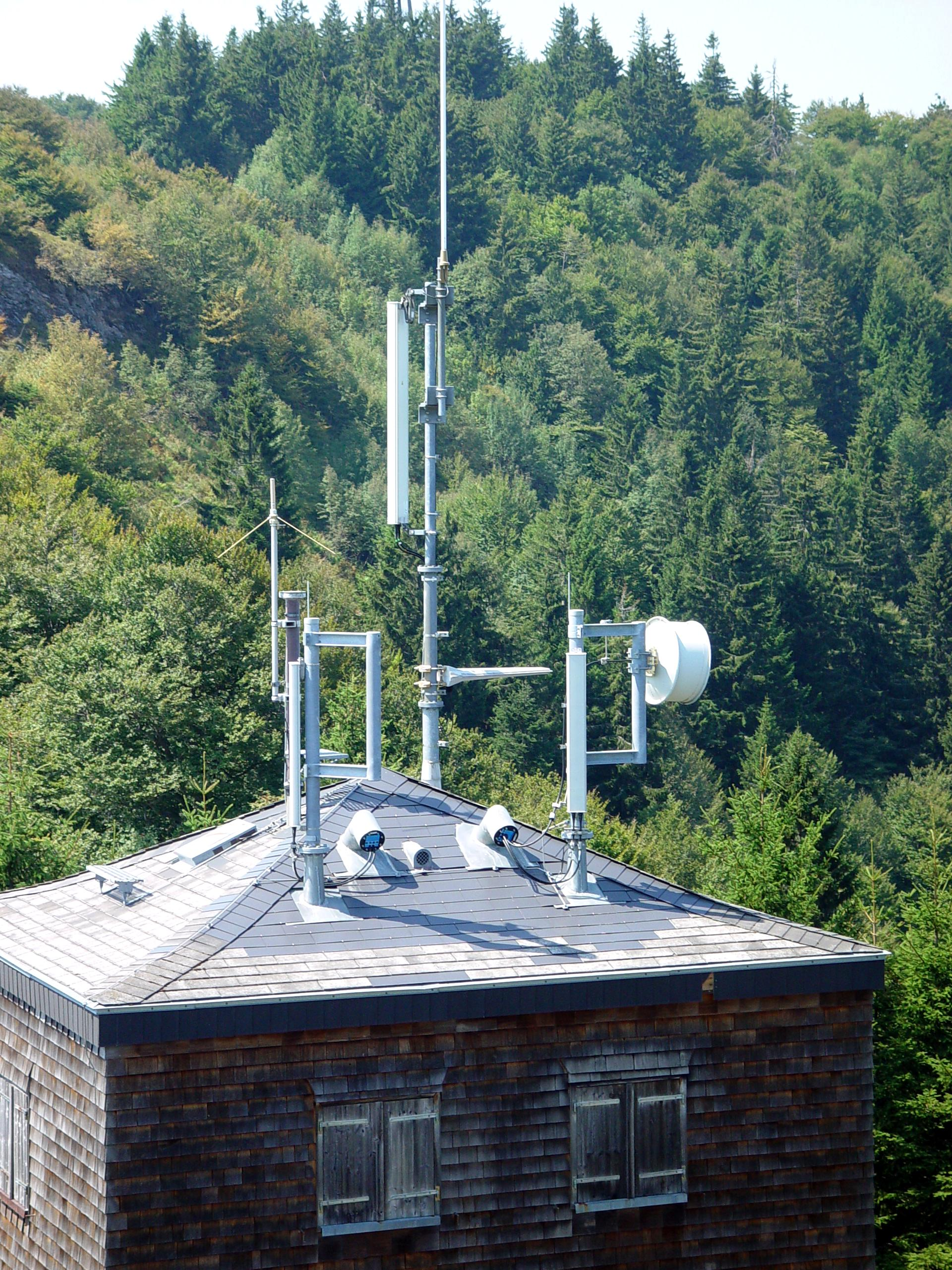
The solar telescope on the Schauinsland

On the Schauinsland, there is a solar telescope, which is operated by the Kiepenheuer Institute for Solar Physics, which nowadays is only used for teaching and PR. Current research is mostly done at the Observatorio del Teide on Tenerife. The observatory can be visited without pre-booking on five open days between May and September, each of which is scheduled at the beginning of the year. On those days guided tours take place between 11:00 and 15:00.

The observatory was founded in 1943 by the German Luftwaffe of the Third Reich to make the most accurate prediction of the ideal frequency for military radio communication by observing the solar activities. It was managed by Karl-Otto Kiepenheuer from 1943 until 1975.

There is also an air measuring station on Schauinsland which belongs to the German environmental federal agency and the federal agency for radiation protection. The concentration of air pollutants is measured as part of the European Monitoring and Evaluation Program (EMEP), the climate-relevant gasses and radionuclides are recorded as part of the GAW. Both this building and the solar telescope were built in 1943 and were used to observe the quality of the ionosphere for the purpose of military radio communication.

A measuring station for the permanent monitoring of the artificial and natural radioactivity in the atmosphere has existed on the Schauinsland since 1957. It was integrated into the newly founded federal agency for radiation protection in 1989. Among other devices to measure traces of radioactivity in the air, the "Ortsdosisleistungs-Messnetz" and the supervision of the adherence to the Comprehensive Nuclear-Test-Ban Treaty (CTBT) takes place there.

== Gallery ==
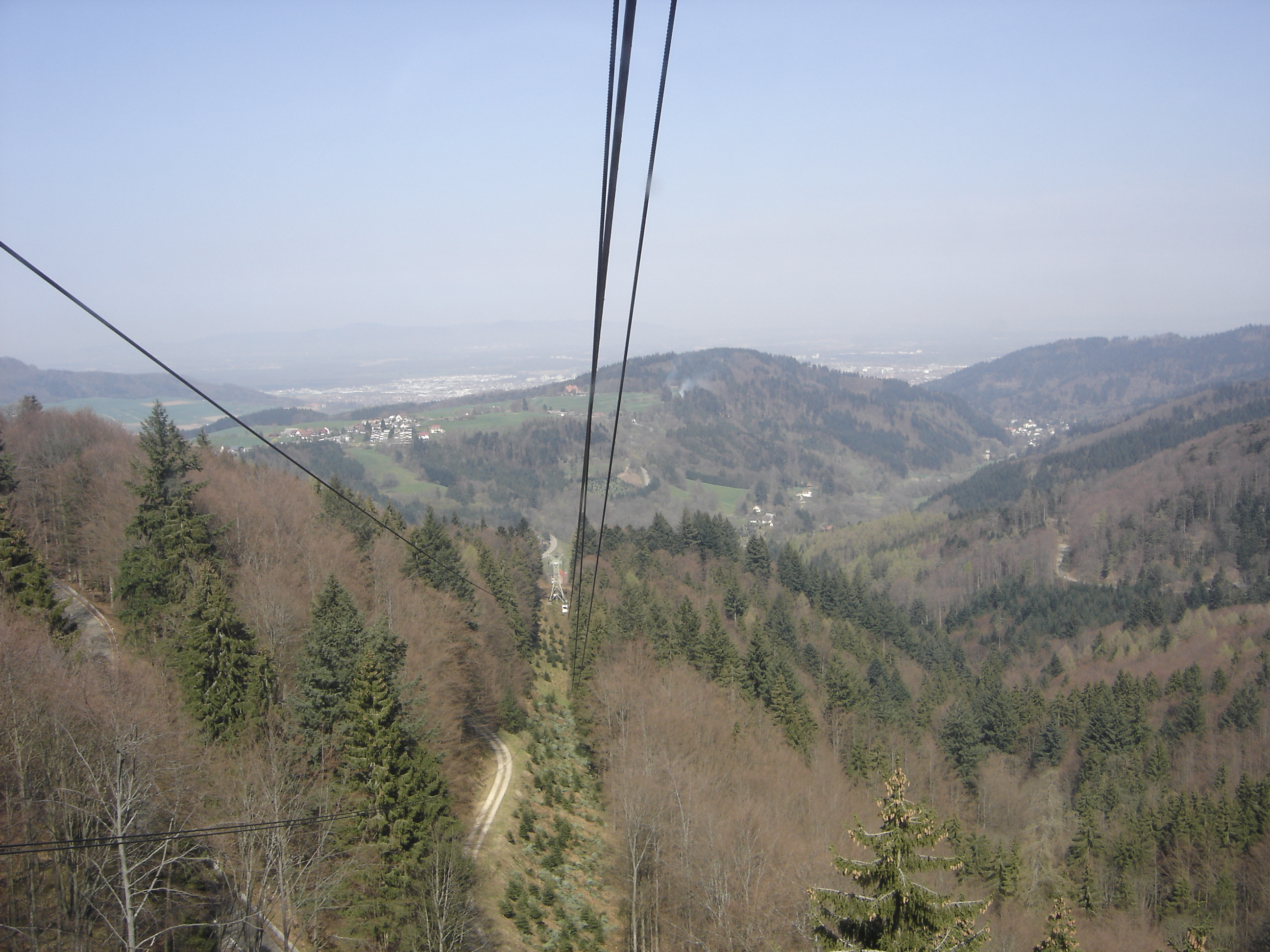
Looking down the Schauinslandbahn towards Freiburg
