= Liberalism in Poland =

Ideology in Poland

Liberalism has been a notable ideology in Poland for hundreds of years. Polish liberalism emphasizes the preservation of democracy and opposition to authoritarianism. Liberalism was first developed in Poland as a response to the Polish–Lithuanian monarchy, and it continued to develop in response to the partition of Poland through the 19th century and Communist rule in the 20th century. Poland has officially been a liberal democracy since 1989, though its status has been challenged as a result of illiberal reforms in the 2010s and 2020s.

== History ==
=== Polish–Lithuanian Commonwealth (1569-1795) ===
The origin of liberalism in Poland is disputed, and two different systems have been credited as the foundation of Polish liberalism. These are the system of gentry democracy in the 16th century and the reforms under Stanisław August Poniatowski in the 18th century. Gentry democracy introduced many ideas to Poland that have parallels in liberalism, including individual liberties, legalism, and the nation as a distinct entity from its ruler. The first major advocate of liberal ideas in Poland was Stanisław Konarski, who criticized the liberum veto in his work On an Effective Counsel in the 1760s. Over the following decades, the Monitor covered the details of social and cultural life in Poland while spreading ideals of a national identity independent of the aristocracy. Józef Wybicki wrote for the Monitor at this time, and his writings reflected his studies of Montesquieu. Hieronim Stroynowski wrote the handbook The Study of Natural and Political Law, Economics and the Law of Nations, which emphasized individual freedoms, private property, contract, and free trade. The rule of Stanisław August Poniatowski brought the Polish–Lithuanian Commonwealth to an end in the 18th century during the Polish Enlightenment.

Liberalism developed in Poland gradually and was influenced by several philosophers. Stanisław Staszic was a prominent philosopher during the Polish Enlightenment, advocating elections and physiocracy. Hugo Kołłątaj recognized the Polish–Lithuanian Commonwealth as a single unitary state with national sovereignty and argued that the contributions of artisans and tradesmen contributed to a country's wealth as well as agriculturists. He also advocated permanent executive government and legal protections of citizens' rights. The Constitution of 3 May 1791 implemented many of these legal ideas and established a constitutionalist system in the final years of the Commonwealth.

=== Partitioned Poland (1795-1918) ===
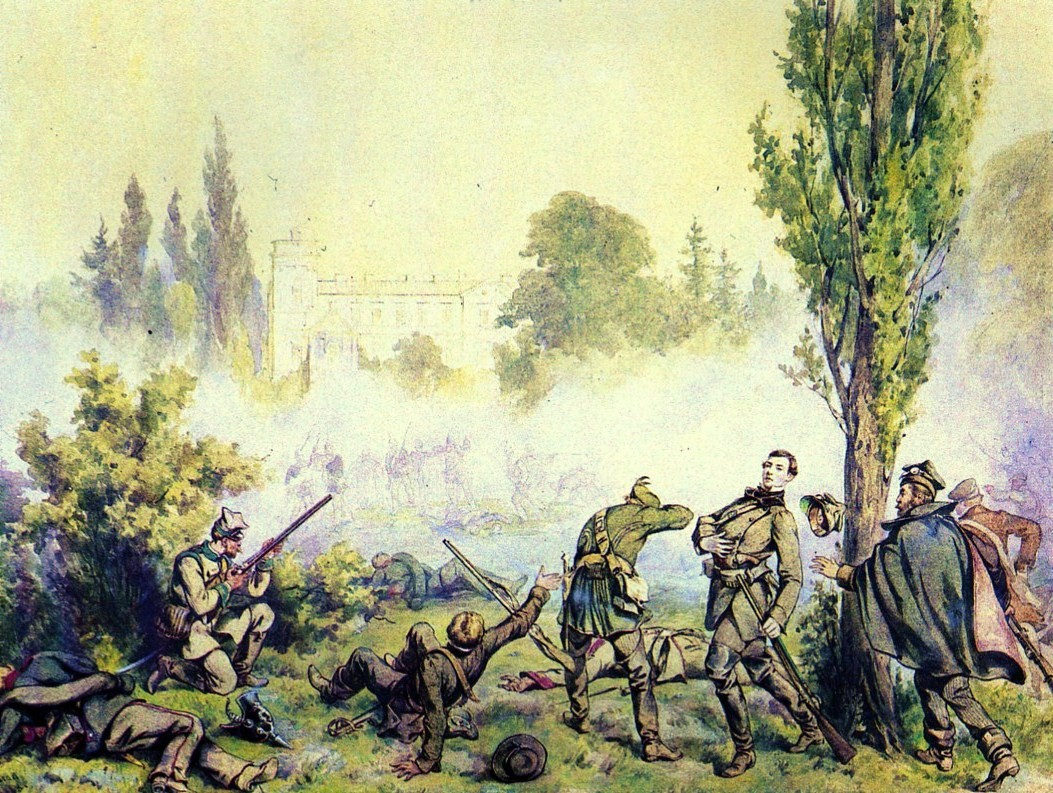
The Battle of Miloslaw during the Greater Poland uprising of 1848.

Following the partition of Poland in 1795, the Polish people did not have a government until the Duchy of Warsaw was established as a client state of the French Empire in 1807. Under this government, the reformists of the Commonwealth were given control over a state bureaucracy and a uniform legal code guided by cameralism. Serfdom was also banned under the Duchy. Its leader, Stanisław Węgrzecki, advocated early liberalism under a "monarch without despotism". The Duchy was dissolved following the fall of the French Empire in 1815, and the Kingdom of Poland was established as an autonomous territory of the Russian Empire. This government underwent liberal reforms that incorporated paternalist actions by the government to support the people. Liberal ideas were spread by professors Jan Śniadecki and Krystyn Lach-Szyrma as well as the Freemasons.

By the 1820s, a conservative backlash to liberalism resulted in several liberal publications being shut down and limited the spread of liberal ideas. The Kaliszanie presented a limited opposition to the conservative majority in government during this time. In advancing liberalism, they advocated personal liberty through an independent judiciary and freedom of the press. The ideology of the Kaliszanie was inspired by the political ideas of Benjamin Constant and the economic ideas of Adam Smith. As with many central European countries, Polish liberals were accepting of liberalism in a monarchy instead of republicanism throughout the 19th century. Following the November Uprising in 1831, Poland lost much of its autonomy and Polish liberalism was further impaired. Polish liberalism saw a revival in the 1840s by focusing on economic rather than political developments. Agricultural advances and the development of railroads strengthened capitalism in Poland and provided new opportunities for Polish society. Intellectual and cultural developments also contributed to the advancement of liberal ideas in Poland during this time, typically through periodicals and the spread of Hegelianism. The system of organic work was implemented to advance these developments. The Revolutions of 1848 represented a major advancement for liberalism in Europe, but the Polish uprising did not succeed in freeing Poland from subjugation.

Liberalism further established itself as the predominant political ideology of Poland in the second half of the 19th century, and it was strengthened through the spread of positivist philosophy and the economic ideas of Józef Supiński. The previously suppressed Russian partition of Poland experienced a revival of liberalism in the late 1850s. Polish liberals in the 1860s were represented by the Whites and opposed by the socialist Reds. Whites such as Józef Ignacy Kraszewski and Karol Ruprecht supported Polish independence but believed that a premature insurrection would harm the Polish people. Liberalism in the 1860s and 1870s was primarily spread through liberal periodicals, such as Gazeta Narodowa and Dziennik Literacki. Liberal thought was divided between the followers of Stanisław Smolka that wished to establish a federalist system within Austria and the followers of Florian Ziemiałkowski that wished to reform the existing governmental system. A new group of radical positivists and rationalists led by Aleksander Świętochowski continued to influence Polish liberalism.

In the 1880s, Polish liberals began to allow for an increased role of government in their philosophy. Beyond military matters, Polish liberals also began to support regulation of the economy by the government to protect the free market and prevent poverty. Positivists also endorsed liberal ideas of cultural assimilation, but cultural prejudice and antisemitism in Poland prevented many other liberals from adopting beliefs. Positivists resisted modernism and ethnic nationalism. Going into the 20th century, liberalism had grown stronger in the Austrian partition while it had been replaced by conservatism in the Prussian partition. Politics became increasingly radical in the Russian partition, and a faction of liberals led by Świętochowski responded with the "progressive democracy" movement, opposing mob rule and partisanship. Other ideas taken on by Polish liberalism in the 1900s included feminism and anti-clericalism.

=== Second Polish Republic and the Polish People's Republic (1918-1989) ===
After becoming independent at the end of World War I, liberal ideas were incorporated into the new Polish government. It was based on western parliamentary government such as that of the French Third Republic, and it incorporated individual rights such as freedom of expression and freedom of religion. Despite this, Poland did not have a strong liberal movement during its interwar independence. The economy of Poland had already been liberalized, and political ideas focused on national identity over individualism. The most prominent liberals at this time were Kraków School economists, advocating individualism over nationalism and collectivism. As a result of the primarily agricultural nature of the Polish economy and the relative lack of industrialization, state intervention became commonplace to spur growth. Hyperinflation and poverty in the 1920s expanded this involvement, and various welfare initiatives were implemented. Liberal government ended in the Second Polish Republic following the coup in 1926.

The invasion of Poland in 1939 ended liberal government in the country and brought about 50 years of one-party rule. During World War II, Poland was occupied by Nazi Germany and the Soviet Union. When the war ended, the Polish People's Republic was established as a Communist client state of the Soviet Union. Liberalism in Communist Poland was preserved by a contingent of Polish citizens along with the Catholic Church. At several points under Communist rule, major protests took place in support of liberalizing the economy. Poland began to liberalize in the 1970s and 1980s as the Communist government adopted increasingly pro-capitalist policies in response to the economic calculation problem and other issues caused by a planned economy. In the final years of Communist rule, the Polish government began to liberalize its economy and restored ties with many international institutions, including the International Monetary Fund and the World Bank.

=== Third Polish Republic (1989-present) ===
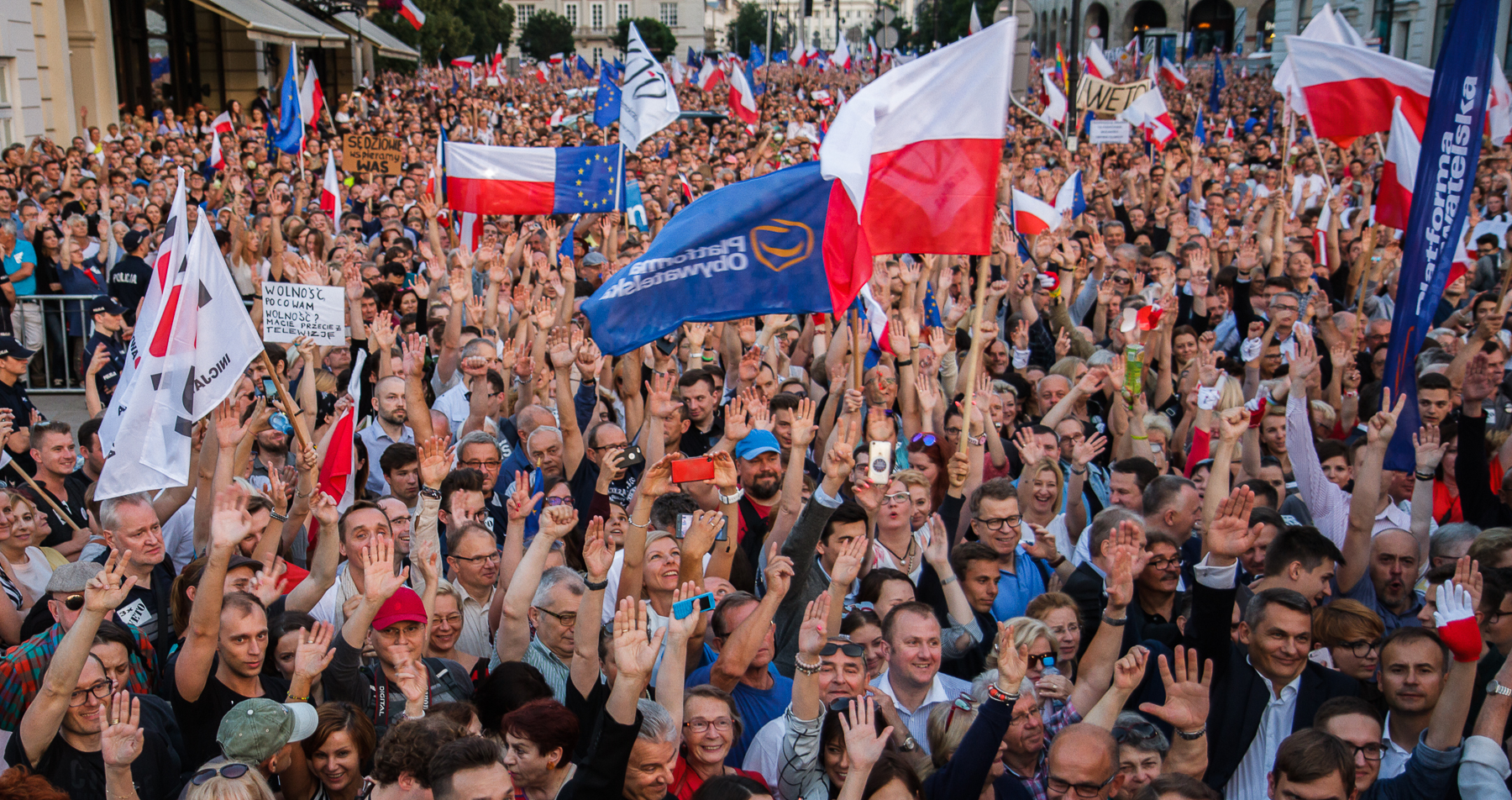
Protesters against illiberal judicial reforms. Warsaw, 2017.

Following the end of Communist rule, Poland underwent a new phase of liberalization. Poland's transition to a liberal democracy appeared to be more unstable due to the country's history of nationalism and the severity of its economic collapse, but liberalism was successfully established in Poland during the 1990s. Free market economists were elected into office and implemented reforms to create a free market in Poland. The Constitution of Poland was ratified in 1997. Poland ascended to NATO in 1999, and NATO initiated a series of reforms to place the Polish military under civilian control. Poland ascended to the European Union in 2003.

Law and Justice (PiS), which has been a major party in Poland since 2005, has been described as "illiberal", and Poland's government under Law and Justice has been described as an "illiberal democracy". Following the establishment of a PiS-controlled government in 2015, a form of illiberal legalism was established in Poland. Under this government, non-governmental organizations, academics, and universities associated with liberalism were penalized or driven out.

== Demographics ==
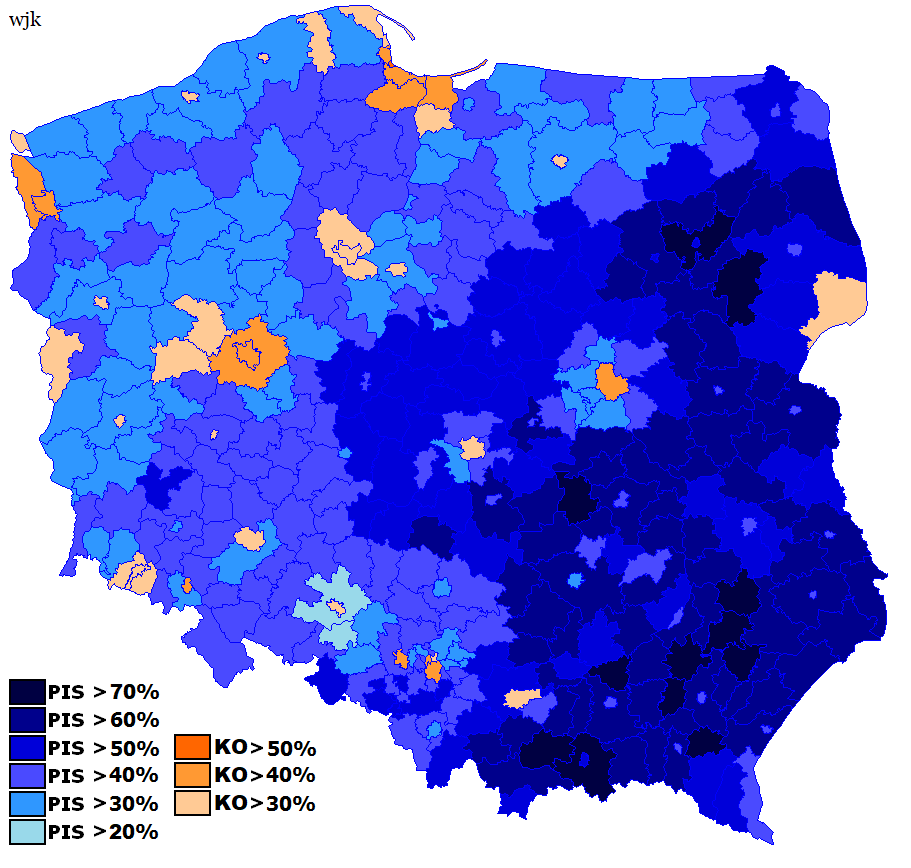
Results of the 2019 Sejm election. Civic Platform denoted in orange.

In the 19th century, the prevalence of liberalism varied among the partitions. It was a major ideology among philosophers in the Austrian and Russian partitions, but it was overshadowed by conservatism in the Prussian partition. Women are more likely than men to vote for liberal candidates in Poland, and the politicization of abortion in Poland has been credited with popularizing liberalism among women in the country. Liberalism is also been associated with secularism in Poland, and it is opposed by highly religious voters and highly Catholic voters in particular. Liberalism is also associated with younger voters, wealthier voters, and urban voters.

== Ideology ==
Polish liberalism has been shaped by the country's turbulent history, including its partition between European great powers in the 18th century and its period of Communist rule in the 20th century. During the 19th century, Polish liberalism was divided among many factions based on different philosophies, including positivism, rationalism, and radicalism. Modern Polish liberalism has been described as being combined with elements of conservatism and republicanism following the end of Communist rule. The history of statelessness in Poland has been credited with a limited popularity of liberalism and a distrust of institutions. Liberals are primarily represented in Polish government by the Civic Coalition. Polish liberals in the 21st century are defined by their adherence to constitutional democracy and rule of law against authoritarianism and nationalism. Liberals in Poland also support the right to abortion, freedom of religion, and LGBT rights.

== Notable figures ==
Various philosophers, politicians, economists, and other individuals have contributed to liberalism in Poland.

=== Born 1700-1799 ===
- Adam Jerzy Czartoryski (1770-1861), diplomat and author
- Hugo Kołłątaj (1750-1812), philosopher
- Stanisław Konarski (1700-1773), author
- Stanisław Małachowski (1736-1809), Prime Minister of Warsaw
- Bonawentura Niemojowski (1787-1835), Kaliszanie leader
- Wincenty Niemojowski (1784-1834), Kaliszanie leader
- Stanisław Staszic (1755-1826), philosopher
- Hieronim Stroynowski (1752-1815), author
- Stanisław Węgrzecki (1765-1845), Duke of Warsaw
- Józef Wybicki (1747-1822), author

=== Born 1800-1899 ===
- Adam Heydel (1893-1941), economist
- Józef Ignacy Kraszewski (1812-1887), author
- Leopold Stanisław Kronenberg (1812-1878), banker
- Adam Krzyżanowski (1873-1963), economist
- Karol Libelt (1807-1875), philosopher
- Karol Ruprecht (1821-1875), journalist
- Stanisław Smolka (1854-1924), historian
- Aleksander Świętochowski (1849-1938), philosopher
- Józef Supiński (1804-1893), economist
- Karol Szajnocha (1818-1868), historian, publisher
- Andrzej Artur Zamoyski (1800-1874), nobleman
- Florian Ziemiałkowski (1817-1900), politician
- Ferdynand Zweig (1896-1988), economist

=== Born 1900-1999 ===
- Leszek Balcerowicz (1947-), Deputy Prime Minister of Poland
- Leszek Kołakowski (1927-2009), philosopher
- Bronisław Komorowski (1952-), President of Poland
- Janusz Lewandowski (1951-), economist
- Tadeusz Mazowiecki (1927-2013), Prime Minister of Poland
- Jan Szomburg (1951-), economist
- Donald Tusk (1957-), Prime Minister of Poland
- Lech Wałęsa (1943-), President of Poland (also called liberal conservative)

== See also ==
- History of philosophy in Poland
- History of Poland
- Human rights in Poland
- Politics of Poland

== Bibliography ==
- Drinóczi, Tímea; Bień-Kacała, Agnieszka (2021). Illiberal Constitutionalism in Poland and Hungary: The Deterioration of Democracy, Misuse of Human Rights and Abuse of the Rule of Law. Routledge. doi:10.4324/9781003175353. ISBN 9781000428766. S2CID 242207908.
- Epstein, Rachel A. (2008). In Pursuit of Liberalism: International Institutions in Postcommunist Europe. Johns Hopkins University Press. ISBN 9780801889776.
- Janowski, Maciej; Przekop, Danuta (2004). Polish Liberal Thought Before 1918. Central European University Press. ISBN 9789639241183.
- Stachura, Peter D. (2004). Poland, 1918-1945: An Interpretive and Documentary History of the Second Republic. Routledge. ISBN 9781134289493.
