= Gavron =

Gavron is a surname. Notable people with the surname include:

- Assaf Gavron (born 1968), Israeli writer, novelist, translator, musician, journalist and hi-tech worker
- Hannah Gavron (1936–1965), Mandatory Palestine-born British sociologist
- Nicky Gavron (born 1941), British politician
- Rafi Gavron (born 1989), English-American actor
- Robert Gavron, Baron Gavron (1930–2015), British printing millionaire, philanthropist and a Labour life peer
- Sarah Gavron (born 1970), British film director
