= Smolka =

Smolka is a Slavic surname that may refer to

- Josef Smolka (born 1939), Czech volleyball player
- Louis Smolka (born 1991), American mixed martial artist
- Lyubov Smolka (born 1952), Soviet Olympic runner
- Martin Smolka (born 1959), Czech classical composer
- Peter Smolka or Smollett (born 1912), Austrian/British journalist and Soviet spy
- Stanisław Smolka (1854–1924), Polish historian
