= Eugen-Keidel Tower =

Coordinates: 47°54′43″N 7°53′55″E

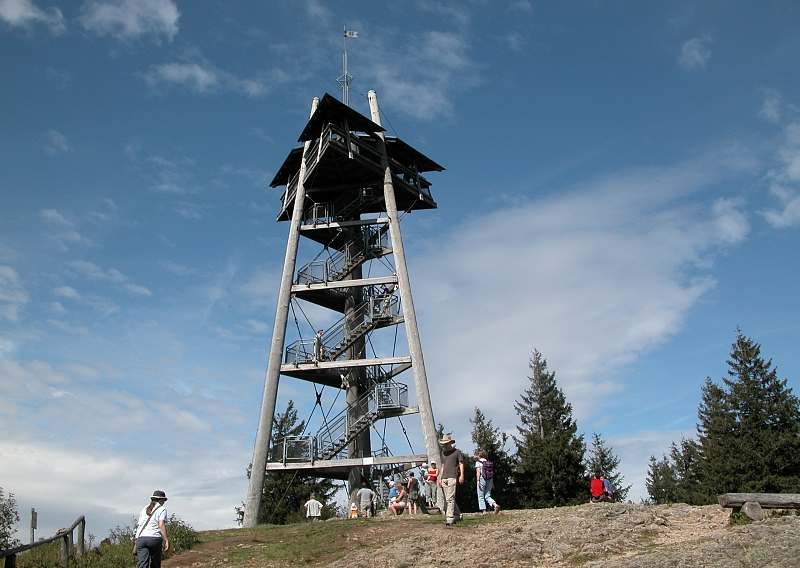
Eugen-Keidel-Turm

Eugen-Keidel Tower is a 31-metre-high observation tower location on the Schauinsland mountain near Freiburg, Germany. It was built in 1981. The Eugen-Keidel Tower has an extraordinary design with a triangular cross section.

== See also ==
- List of towers
