= Kin + Carta =

Kin and Carta plc
- Trade name: Kin + Carta
- Formerly: St Ives
- Type: Public
- Traded as: LSE: KCT
- Industry: Digital transformation consultancy
- Founded: 1964; 62 years ago in St Ives, Cambridgeshire, UK
- Founder: Robert Gavron
- Headquarters: London, United Kingdom
- Key people: Kelly Manthey, CEO; Chris Kutsor, CFO
- Revenue: ▼£195.9 million (2023)
- Operating income: ▼£18.5 million (2023)
- Net income: ▼£(18.8) million (2023)
- Parent: Valtech (2024–present)
- Subsidiaries: Spire Digital; Melon; Frakton; Loop Integration; Forecast; Cascade Data Labs
- Website: kinandcarta.com

Kin + Carta was an international digital transformation consultancy company with headquarters in London, UK. Originally founded in 1964 as printer St Ives, it grew to be the UK's leading print company by the 1980s. It shifted focus away from the struggling print industry during the 2010s and rebranded as Kin + Carta in 2018.

== History ==
Printing company St Ives was founded in 1964 by Robert Gavron. Then a lawyer, he borrowed £5,000 (equivalent to £118,000 or US$151,000 in 2024) to purchase a failing publishing company and renamed it after the town where it was located, St Ives, Cambridgeshire. The company grew over the next 30 years to become the foremost U.K. commercial printer, acquiring Clays and other rivals along the way. It was first listed on the LSE in 1985 and reached a market value of £400 million (US$550 million) in 1993.

St Ives expanded into the U.S. with the acquisition of commercial printer A.D. Weiss in 1989, and then later into European markets with German direct mail firm Johler Druck. In 1993 Gavron retired as company chairman, though he still held considerable interest, and was replaced by Miles Emley.

In the 21st century St Ives began a serious decline along with the rest of the printing industry due to the rise of digital media, reporting its first loss in 2009. It then undertook a large series of acquisitions in the digital technology space, attempting to diversify away from print. The first purchase was digital marketing and data company Occam in 2010. The 80-staff firm was acquired for about £12 million.

St Ives acquired Chicago-based software consultancy Solstice Mobile for £23 million. Solstice had been founded in 2001 by John "J" Schwan and named to University of Illinois at Chicago’s Chicago Area Entrepreneurship Hall of Fame in 2013. Schwan became St Ives' first chief digital officer at the time of the merger and in 2018 took over the CEO position from Matt Armitage. Also in that year the firm sold all its remaining print operations and rebranded as Kin + Carta, said to represent "connection and collaboration".

In 2021 it became the first company traded on the London Stock Exchange to be certified as a B Corporation. In October 2023, Kelvin UK Bidco, a newly-formed UK company, owned by the private equity firm Apax Partners, offered to acquire Kin + Carta for £203 million.

In April 2024, Kin + Carta was acquired by Valtech.

Acquisition history

Year	Company	Industry	Price (£)	Price after inflation	Ref
1983	Severn Valley Press				
1986	Clays Limited	Book printing			
1987	Burrups Limited	Financial printing			
1989	A.D. Weiss Printing	Commercial printing			
1995	Johler Druck	Direct mail			
1996	Perlmuter Printing	Direct mail			
1998	Hunters Armley	Direct mail	33m	64m	
2000	Packard Press	Financial printing			
2000	Global Financial	Financial printing			
2001	Avanti/Case-Hoyt	Commercial printing	29m	54m	
2004	SP Group	Point-of-sale printing	37m	67m	
2010	Occam	Digital marketing and data	12m	19m	
2011	Response One	Data marketing	19m	28m	
2011	Pragma	Consulting	6m	9m	
2012	Incite	Research consulting	17m	24m	
2013	Amaze	Digital marketing	25m	35m	
2013	Branded3	Search and digital	25m	35m	
2014	Realise	Digital marketing	40m	55m	
2015	Solstice Mobile	Consulting	23m	32m	
2016	The App Business	Mobile	50m	69m	
2019	Spire Digital	Software development	12m	15m	
2020	Cascade Data Labs	Data science	22m	28m	
2021	Octain	Artificial intelligence			
2022	Loop Integration	E-commerce			
2022	Melon	Digital transformation	24m		
2023	Forecast Data	Data services	3m		

== Culture ==
Kin + Carta describes its purpose as "to make the world work better for everyone", and to this end has adopted a triple bottom line strategy. In 2021 it became the first company traded on the London Stock Exchange to be certified as a B Corporation, and in 2022 became one of the 50 companies participating in the environmentalism initiative Vision 2045. Kin + Carta also became a member of the MACH Alliance in 2022, advocating for accessibility, inclusivity, and sustainability in the digital space.
