= Hannah Gavron =

British sociologist and writer (1936–1965)

- חנה גברון
- Born: Ann Fyvel; 19 August 1936; Tel Aviv, Mandatory Palestine
- Died: 14 December 1965 (aged 29); Highgate, London, UK
- Occupations: Sociologist; writer
- Spouse: Robert Gavron (m. 1955; sep. 1964)
- Children: 2
- Father: T. R. Fyvel
- Relatives: Rafi Gavron (grandson)

Academic background
- Education: Bedford College
- Thesis: The position and opportunities of young mothers – Progress or retrogression. (A study of the difficulties confronting young mothers in the contemporary family based on a comparative study of working class and middle class families) (1965)
- Doctoral advisor: Ronald Fletcher

Academic work
- Notable works: The Captive Wife: Conflicts of Housebound Mothers (1966)

Ann "Hannah" Gavron (Note: Named Ann at birth, Gavron used the name Hannah both privately and professionally.)(Hebrew: חנה גברון; née Fyvel; 19 August 1936 – 14 December 1965) was a British sociologist and writer, known for her posthumous 1966 work The Captive Wife: Conflicts of Housebound Mothers.

== Early life and family ==
Gavron was born Ann Fyvel (Hebrew: אן פייבל) on 19 August 1936 in Tel Aviv, Mandatory Palestine to T. R. Fyvel, a writer, left-wing Zionist and literary editor of the Tribune, and Mary Fyvel (née Kirschner). Fyvel's father was born in Germany to Jewish immigrant parents, whilst her mother was born in present-day South Africa. Following the Second World War, the family settled in England. In 1948, Fyvel enrolled at Frensham Heights School as a border. Whilst at school, Fyvel was groomed and sexually abused by the school's headmaster Kenneth Keast. Accepted into the Royal Academy of Dramatic Art at aged sixteen, Fyvel enrolled in 1953 but left the course after a year. (Note: Fyvel is also cited as having graduated from her course.)

In November 1954, Fyvel became engaged to Robert Gavron (later Baron Gavron), the future printer, publisher, and philanthropist, who at the time was studying for the Bar at the Middle Temple. 17 years old at the time of her engagement, and six years Gavron's junior, Fyvel's parents made her wait till she was 18 to marry. On 3 July 1955, Fyvel and Gavron married at Hampstead Synagogue. The couple had two sons, the publisher Simon Gavron (1958–2005) and the writer Jeremy Gavron (born 1961). Through her son Simon, Gavron was the grandmother of the actor Rafi Gavron.

== Career and legacy ==
In 1956, Gavron enrolled at Bedford College, University of London. Studying sociology, an emerging subject at degree level in post-war Britain, Gavron became pregnant with her first son during the second year of her degree. Graduating with a first-class degree in 1960, Gavron began her PhD the same year under the supervision of Ronald Fletcher. Becoming pregnant with her second son shortly after starting her doctoral research, Gavron's thesis was entitled The position and opportunities of young mothers – Progress or retrogression. (A study of the difficulties confronting young mothers in the contemporary family based on a comparative study of working class and middle class families). Gavron struggled to have doctoral research topic approved due to its subject matter and her desire to use the emerging technique of semi-structured interviewing. Her department insisted that there was a quantitative element to her research, setting Gavron a target of 100 interviews in order to carry out statistical analysis. Aiming to "test further the findings of" the 1957 study Family and Kinship in East London, Gavron worked to develop an analysis of women's experience which was centred around them and to challenge assumptions made by male academics about the power of the mother–daughter relationship (especially in working-class families) to mitigate the difficulties of motherhood. Alongside her PhD Gavron began reviewing books about women, family, and marriage for publications such as New Society. In 1963, Gavron undertook a temporary lectureship in sociology at Hornsey School of Art. (Note: Also cited as taking place after completing her doctorate.) Gavron attempted to procure a permanent lectureship at the London School of Economics but was rejected twice. Handing in her thesis in mid-1964, the same year she separated from her husband, Gavron was awarded her doctorate in 1965. (Note: Also cited as being awarded in 1964.) The same year Gavron was offered a postdoctoral researcher position at the Institute of Education, and had a contract to write an 'Introduction to Sociology' textbook and to turn her PhD thesis into a book.

On 14 December 1965, Gavron died by suicide at a friend's home in Highgate, London using a gas oven. The year after her death, Gavron's thesis was published as The Captive Wife: Conflicts of Housebound Mothers, which is cited as an early example of the emergent British feminist literature and a noted early sociological study on women and work. It was a qualitative sociological analysis of narrative accounts of working- and middle-class married women's lives, and has been called one of the "classic examples of feminist interpretation of housework". She argued that women tended to leave paid work after childbirth and that motherhood stripped women of independence, bringing their values and aspirations as 'New' women into conflict with the traditional role they were having to play as mothers. In the view of Helen McCarthy, this study meant that Fyvel (Gavron) was one of a number of researchers in the 1950s and early 1960s (such as Nancy Seear, Viola Klein, Ferdynand Zweig, Judith Hubback and Pearl Jephcott) who "helped to entrench new understandings of married women's employment as a fundamental feature of advanced industrial societies, and one that solved the dilemmas of 'modern' woman across social classes." In 1990, Ann Oakley wrote that Gavron was an "optimistic pioneer of modern feminism" who "stood as a role model for many of us, trying to make our way in the male-dominated world of social science. She even at times appears in the guise of a cultural metaphor à la Sylvia Plath and many others – a woman torn apart by her position on the edge of time, by those same dilemmas of being female which form the subject matter of her work and writing".

In 2015, Gavron's son Jeremy published his memoirs of her, A Woman on The Edge of Time, which was the 15 Minute Drama on BBC Radio 4 in June 2019.
