= John Smith (sociologist) =

English sociologist

- Born: John Harold Smith; 21 April 1927; Folkestone, Kent, England
- Died: 4 May 2002 (aged 74)

Academic background
- Education: London School of Economics

Academic work
- Discipline: Sociologist
- Institutions: Acton Society Trust; London School of Economics; University of Southampton

John Harold Smith (1927–2002) was an English sociologist. He was Professor of Sociology at the University of Southampton from 1964 to 1991.

== Early life ==
Born in Folkestone on 21 April 1927, Smith attended Harvey Grammar School; during World War II, he served with the Royal Observer Corps and as a meteorologist in the Royal Navy. On demobilisation, he read sociology at the London School of Economics, graduating in 1950.

== Academic career ==
Smith then worked as a researcher at the Acton Society Trust, before returning to the LSE as a lecturer in social sciences and administration. In 1964, he became the first Professor of Sociology and head of the Sociology and Social Policy Department at the University of Southampton; he retired in 1991. At Southampton, he was the dean of social sciences from 1967 to 1970 and the deputy vice-chancellor from 1974 to 1978. He was also involved in expanding its library and special collections and was described in one obituary as the "driving force" behind the university's Nuffield Theatre, Turner Sims Concert Hall and John Hansard Gallery.

According to The Guardian, Smith "played a leading role in developing the University of Southampton's social sciences faculty and was an authority on the social psychologist Elton Mayo"; an industrial sociologist by specialism, he co-authored (with Nancy Seear and Pearl Jephcott) Married Working Women in 1962, as well as a number of other monographs and articles related to his discipline. In the 1970s and 1980s, he researched the impact of computing.

== Personal life ==
Smith was a keen gardener, follower of cricket and fan of Hitchcock's thrillers and western films. He married Jean Horton in 1951 and had with her three children Christopher, Nigel and Rachel, who all survived him when he died on 4 May 2002.
