= Rafi Gavron =

British actor

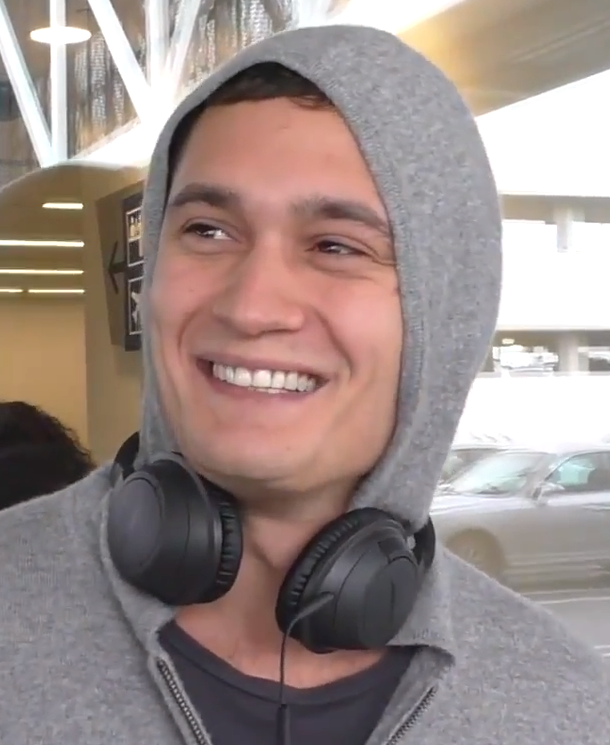
- Gavron in 2016
- Born: Raphael Pichey Gavron; 24 June 1989 (age 37); Hendon, London, England
- Occupation: Actor
- Years active: 2006–present

Raphael Pichey Gavron (born June 24, 1989) is a British actor. He is best known for his roles in the films Breaking and Entering (2006), Nick & Norah's Infinite Playlist (2008), A Star Is Born (2018), as well as the television series Life Unexpected (2010-2011) and Godfather of Harlem (2019-).

== Early life ==
Gavron was born in Hendon, London, England, the son of writer Martha Pichey and the late publisher Simon Gavron. His mother is American, and his father was British. Gavron was raised in a Jewish family in North London. His paternal grandparents were Robert Gavron, Baron Gavron, a British printing millionaire, philanthropist and Labour life peer, and sociologist Hannah Fyvel, who was born in Tel Aviv and died by suicide at age 29. His great-grandfather was writer Tosco R. Fyvel, who worked with author George Orwell. His half-aunt (his father's half-sister) is director Sarah Gavron. Gavron has two younger brothers – Benjamin (born 1992) and Moses (born 1996). In 2008, Gavron volunteered at a kibbutz in Israel for six months.

== Career ==
In Breaking and Entering, Gavron played Miro, a young burglar who uses techniques from parkour to gain access to the high-tech offices of an urban landscape architect; he performed several difficult physical feats in the film. For his role, Gavron received a nomination for the Most Promising Newcomer award at the British Independent Film Awards.

Gavron played the hired assassin Duro in the second season of HBO's Rome. He also appeared in the 2008 release Nick and Norah's Infinite Playlist as Dev, the gay lead singer of Nick's band.

In Inkheart, a movie adaptation of the novel of the same name, Gavron played Farid, a character from The Book of One Thousand and One Nights, magically brought to life. The film was released theatrically in January 2009.

He guest starred on a few episodes of 24, as Hamid Al-Zarian, the younger brother of an assumed terrorist. He also appeared in JoJo's music video for the song "Disaster" in November 2011. Gavron played Bug (Bobby) in the TV series Life Unexpected. He was chosen as Lux's long known friend and also Lux's boyfriend.

In 2013, he co-starred in Snitch, playing the son of Dwayne Johnson's character. His next film roles were in the action adventure Tracers (2015) and the drama The Land (2016).

In 2019 he joined the cast of Godfather of Harlem in the role of Ernie Nunzi.

In 2024, Gavron joined Amazon MGM Studios' sci-fi thriller entitled Mercy, an upcoming sci-fi film from director Timur Bekmambetov.

== Personal life ==
Gavron was arrested twice in 2013 after being accused of domestic abuse, and driving under the influence.

== Filmography ==
=== Film ===
Key
†	Denotes films that have not yet been released

Year	Title	Role	Notes
2006	Breaking and Entering	Miro Simic	
2008	Nick & Norah's Infinite Playlist	Dev	
2008	Inkheart	Farid	
2012	Celeste and Jesse Forever	Rupert Bates	
2012	The Cold Light of Day	Josh Shaw	
2012	Mine Games	Lex	
2013	Snitch	Jason Collins	
2015	Tracers	Dylan	
2016	The Land	Patty Cake	
2016	Love Is All You Need?	Stan	
2018	A Star Is Born	Rez Gavron	
2020	Books of Blood	Simon	
2026	Mercy	Holt Charles	
2026	The Odyssey	Second Trojan	

=== Television ===
Year	Title	Role	Notes
2007	Rome	Duro	3 episodes
2009	24	Hamid Al-Za	3 episodes
2010	Life Unexpected	Bobby “Bug” Guthrie	Recurring role, 8 episodes
2011	CSI: Miami	Sean Moran	1 episode
2011	Parenthood	Troy Quinn	2 episodes
2016	Mary + Jane	#softs3rve	1 episode
2016	From Dusk till Dawn: The Series	Pablo	1 episode
2017	Bones	Benny Pence	1 episode
2018	Homecoming	Rainey	2 episodes
2018	Counterpart	Edgar	2 episodes
2019	Catch-22	Aarfy Aardvark	Miniseries, 6 episodes
2019–2021	Godfather of Harlem	Ernie Nunzi	Main role, 19 episodes
2020	Westworld	Roderick	2 episodes
2023	Ghosts of Beirut	Chet	1 episode
