= T. R. Fyvel =

British writer (1907–1985)

Raphael Joseph Feiwel (1907 – 22 June 1985), better known as Tosco R. Fyvel or T. R. Fyvel (Hebrew: טוסקו פייבל), was a writer, journalist and literary editor. In 1936–1937, he was active in the Zionist movement in Palestine, then under the control of the British mandate, and worked with Golda Meir.

The T R Fyvel Book Award, awarded to a "book which has given new insight into issues or events, shown a perspective not often acknowledged, or given a platform to new voices", is one of the five Freedom of Expression awards presented by Index on Censorship.

== Life and career ==
Fyvel was born in Cologne, Germany. His mother, Sterna (Schneerson), was from a Belarusian Jewish family, was a niece of essayist Ahad Ha'am, and had worked for Chaim Weizmann. His father, Berthold Feiwel, from a Moravian Jewish family, was an executive director of Keren Hayesod.

Fyvel (or, as he then still was, Feiwel) studied the Moral Sciences tripos (i.e. Philosophy) at Christ's College, Cambridge, where he graduated with a third-class degree in 1928. Following his graduation, Fyvel moved to Palestine, where he spent some time as an assistant to Meir in the Histadrut. Returning to Britain, during the Second World War he worked in counter-intelligence.

Fyvel first met George Orwell in January 1940 when their mutual publisher, Fredric Warburg, introduced the two men. Although Orwell did not agree with the proposed independent Jewish state in Palestine, they became friends and sometimes met at Warburg's home in Reading. The three men planned a series of pamphlets/essays to be published by Secker & Warburg as Searchlight Books.

In 1945, he succeeded Orwell as literary editor of the Tribune newspaper when Orwell left to become a war correspondent for The Observer. Fyvel remained in this post until 1949. In the early 1950s, he was a founder and contributor to Encounter. From 1973 to 1983, he was literary editor of The Jewish Chronicle.

Fyvel was married to the South African-born Mary Kirschner. Their daughter, writer Hannah Fyvel, was the wife of Robert Gavron, Baron Gavron. Fyvel's great-grandson is actor Rafi Gavron.

== Publications ==
- 1938: No Ease in Zion
- 1940: The Malady and the Vision
- 1961: The Insecure Offenders
- 1964: Troublemakers: Rebellious Youth in an Affluent Society (Schocken)
- 1968: The Frontiers of Sociology (Routledge & Kegan Paul, London)
- 1968: Intellectuals Today (Chatto & Windus, London)
- 1983: George Orwell: A Personal Memoir
