= Tracers (film) =

- Theatrical release poster
- Directed by: Daniel Benmayor
- Screenplay by: Matt Johnson
- Story by: T. J. Scott; Kevin Lund; Matt Johnson
- Produced by: Marty Bowen; Wyck Godfrey; D. Scott Lumpkin
- Starring: Taylor Lautner; Marie Avgeropoulos; Adam Rayner; Rafi Gavron
- Cinematography: Nelson Cragg
- Edited by: Peter Amundson
- Music by: Lucas Vidal
- Production companies: Saban Films; Freerunning; Melbarken; Temple Hill Entertainment
- Distributed by: Saban Films
- Release dates: January 15, 2015 (Denmark); March 20, 2015 (United States)
- Running time: 94 minutes
- Country: United States
- Language: English
- Box office: $3.3 million

Tracers is a 2015 American action film directed by Daniel Benmayor with a screenplay by Matt Johnson and a story by Johnson, T. J. Scott and Kevin Lund that was released on March 20. The film stars Taylor Lautner, Marie Avgeropoulos, Adam Rayner, and Rafi Gavron.

== Plot ==
Cam is an NYC bike messenger who rents a garage from a woman named Angie and also struggling to make ends meet. While on a run, Cam wrecks his bike after a stranger named Nikki causes an accident while escaping from police officers. Cam is later accosted by two enforcers Jerry and Hu, who take his check and cash, warning him that he is behind on payments for a $15,000 loan to the Tong, a local gang that controls Chinatown, and warn him not to miss another payment. Cam spends his free time trying to fix his father's 1967 Pontiac GTO. Cam's boss calls and tells him that his "girlfriend" has dropped off his new bike. Cam finds Nikki to thank her and tries to copy Nikki's parkour, but to no avail. Cam also meets Nikki's group, who warn him about the dangers of parkour.

Cam begins practicing parkour and eventually catches the attention of the group, where he is invited to train with them. Cam is formally introduced to the rest of the squad: Jax, Tate, Nikki's older brother Dylan, and Miller, the group's leader. After a workout, Cam arrives home to find Jerry and Hu taking his father's car, taking off $5,000 off his debt for it. They warn him he has one month to pay the rest of the $10,000, threatening Angie and her son. Angered, Angie packs Cam's belongings and kicks him out. Cam joins the group for work. Miller tells Cam that he must follow two rules: if Cam gets into trouble, he must call him immediately and he must stay out of Chinatown. Cam quickly becomes a valuable member of the team. He visits Angie at work and explains that he took the loan from the Tongs to help his sick mother keep her house, but that the money wasn't enough to stop foreclosure and his mother died a week after.

Cam runs into Jerry and Hu, who beat him for not having the money and give him two weeks to pay off his debt or they will kill Angie and Joey. Cam makes a move on Nikki at a party. Nikki initially reciprocates, but then runs out of the party. Miller arrives to pick her up as she is Miller's partner. Nikki apologizes to Cam for not being honest. Cam invites Nikki to leave the city with him once he clears his debt, but Nikki is hesitant. For their biggest heist yet, the group tries to rob a bank which is run by Vietnamese gangsters. They discover that the money had been moved earlier and flee as reinforcements arrive. Jax is shot and killed, while Cam is arrested. Miller visits Cam while the police question him. Miller reveals himself to be James Hatcher, a corrupt DEA agent. Miller tells Cam that he can free him by claiming him as a confidential informant for the DEA in exchange for helping him pull off one last heist.

Cam reluctantly agrees and confronts Nikki for not telling him about Miller's true identity. Nikki apologizes and reveals she is indebted to Miller for helping Dylan escape custody for beating a man who had sexually assaulted her. On the day of the heist, Miller, Cam, and Dylan go to a Russian safehouse to steal a stash of diamonds. Nikki realizes Cam is being set up and tries to save him. Miller steals the diamonds and almost kills Cam, but is stopped as guards arrive and attack them. Cam takes the diamonds and flees, where Miller chases him. After reuniting with Nikki, Cam leads Miller into a restaurant owned by Chen, who is the leader of the Tongs. Chen reminds Miller that he has violated his agreement to never enter Chinatown and has him board a ship headed for Macau, never to return. Cam hands the diamonds to Chen, thus clearing his debt. Jerry congratulates Cam for clearing his debt and returns his father's fully restored car, which Cam and Nikki drive off.

== Cast ==
- Taylor Lautner as Cam
- Marie Avgeropoulos as Nikki
- Adam Rayner as Miller
- Rafi Gavron as Dylan
- Christopher Jackson as Lonnie
- Luciano Acuna Jr. as Tate
- Josh Yadon as Jax
- Johnny M. Wu as Jerry
- Sam Medina as Hu
- Amirah Vann as Angie
- Christian Steel as Joey
- Wai Ching Ho as Chen

== Production ==
The shooting of the film began on June 18, 2013, and wrapped on August 1, 2013, with filming locations including Central Park, Riverside Park, and Long Island City. Shooting also took place in Hackensack, New Jersey

Taylor Lautner learned parkour for the film.

== Release ==
=== Home media ===
The film earned $1.6 million in home video sales.

=== Critical response ===
On Rotten Tomatoes, the film has an approval rating of 25%, based on 28 reviews, with an average rating of 4.40/10. On Metacritic, the film has a weighted average score of 45 out of 100, based on reviews from 13 critics, indicating "mixed or average reviews". Called "fun to watch" for the action sequences and energetic use of young actors trained in parkour, the plot was generally regarded as a "B-Movie".

=== Accolades ===
Award	Category	Recipient(s)	Result	Ref.
Teen Choice Awards	Choice Movie: Action		Nominated	
Teen Choice Awards	Choice Movie Actor: Action	Taylor Lautner	Nominated	
