= English calamity =

Death of five English students on a hiking trip in Germany

Coordinates: 47.912°N 7.909°E

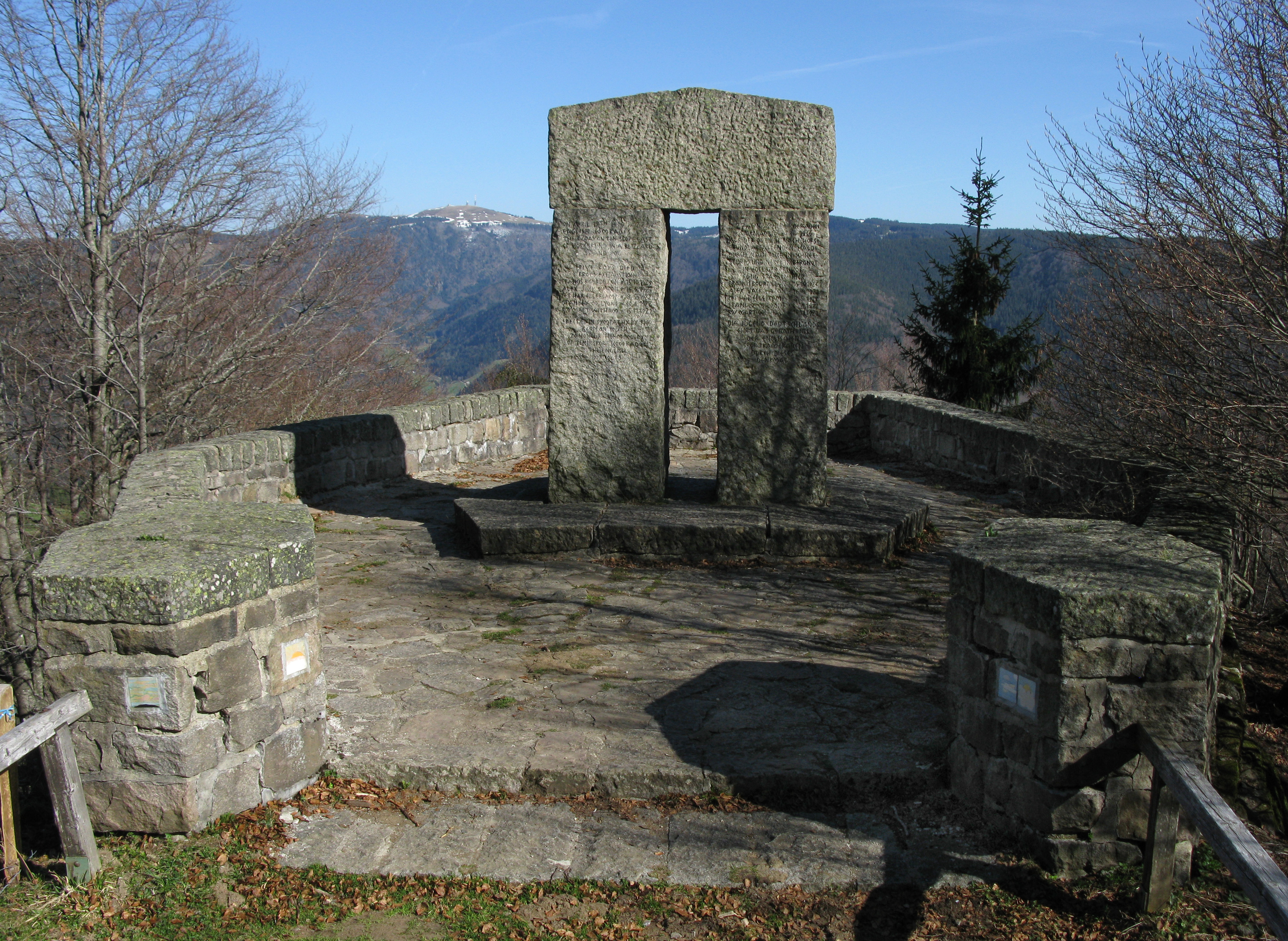
The Engländerdenkmal, a memorial to those lost

The English calamity (German: Engländerunglück) was a hiking disaster that happened on the Schauinsland near Freiburg im Breisgau, Baden-Württemberg, Germany, on 17 April 1936. A group of twenty-seven English schoolboys were stranded after they were led up the mountain by their teacher, Kenneth Keast, who ignored multiple warnings of poor weather conditions. While hiking along the crest of the mountain, the ill-prepared group became disoriented due to fog and an ongoing snowstorm. With the intervention of residents from a nearby village, the majority of the group were returned to safety. Five students died from exhaustion.

Following the incident, Keast gave a misleading account in which he denied culpability and insisted he was unaware of the imminent weather. He was hailed as a hero, and his true role in the accident remained unknown for decades.

The Nazi Party in Germany used the incident to put forth a propaganda narrative presenting itself as a benevolent state despite worsening relations with the United Kingdom. Both the German and British governments declined to investigate the incident, in order to avoid jeopardising relations. It was not until the 2010s that it was more thoroughly re-examined.

== Background ==
During the Easter break of 1936, twenty-seven students from Strand School in South London went on a ten-day excursion to the Black Forest, in what was then Nazi Germany. The group's leader and sole adult chaperone, Kenneth Keast, was the school's English, German and physical education teacher. The boys in Keast's travel group were aged between 12 and 17, with the oldest participant, Douglas Mortifee, assisting as prefect.

The trip had been privately offered by Keast through the School Travel Service, a London travel agency, rather than being organised by the school. The group arrived in Freiburg im Breisgau early on the morning of 16 April. The following day, they embarked on the first leg of their hike, which was supposed to take them over the Schauinsland and through the Notschrei mountain pass to a youth hostel in Todtnauberg called "Radschert". The planned route from Freiburg to Todtnauberg was more than 20 kilometres (12 mi) long and ascended 1,000 metres (3,300 ft) up the Schauinsland, a highly challenging route even under favourable conditions. Keast's group was not adequately equipped for the endeavour. Despite the cold weather, the boys mostly wore summer clothing with light shoes, shorts and no head cover. Keast only had a map from the travel agency with a scale of 1:100,000 which marked hiking trails but did not provide topographical information, rather than a detailed hiking map published by the Schwarzwaldverein.

== Events ==
=== Warnings ===
Keast had been warned about the weather several times before and during the hike. The weather report posted in the youth hostel for 17 April clearly indicated a change in the weather. The mountain station of the Schauinsland cable car had reported temperatures of 3 °C (37 °F) in the morning, with fog, snowfall and about 12 cm (4 1/2 in) of snow. Keast could have accessed this weather report by telephone.

Hostel warden Hermann Reichert and storekeeper Carl Rockweiler, two experienced mountain hikers, expressed their concerns to Keast and urged him not to use the snow-covered hiking trails under any circumstances, but keep to the cleared road instead. In spite of their warnings, Keast left the road near Günterstal.

When Keast asked for directions on his own at the St. Valentin inn, east of Günterstal, the innkeeper there also advised against a hike to the Schauinsland and pointed out that all paths and signposts were deeply covered in snow. Keast replied that he would just clear the snow off. The landlord at the inn did not notice he had a group of schoolchildren with him until they set off.

At around 15:00 near the Kohlerhau locality, Keast – according to his own testimony – had a short conversation with two forestry workers who had stopped working due to the weather. He asked for directions, but saw no reason to break off the hike. This meeting is not mentioned in the prosecutor's report.

Shortly after, in the upper Kappler valley, the group met a local postman, Otto Steiert, who had just returned from the nearby miners' hostel (Bergwerkszechenheim) of the Schauinsland mines. Steiert urgently warned Keast against any further ascent, pointing out the increasing snowfall, and offered to lead the group safely to Kappel. Keast declined, asking for further directions to the Schauinsland summit. He did not consider staying at the miners' hostel.

=== Blizzard ===
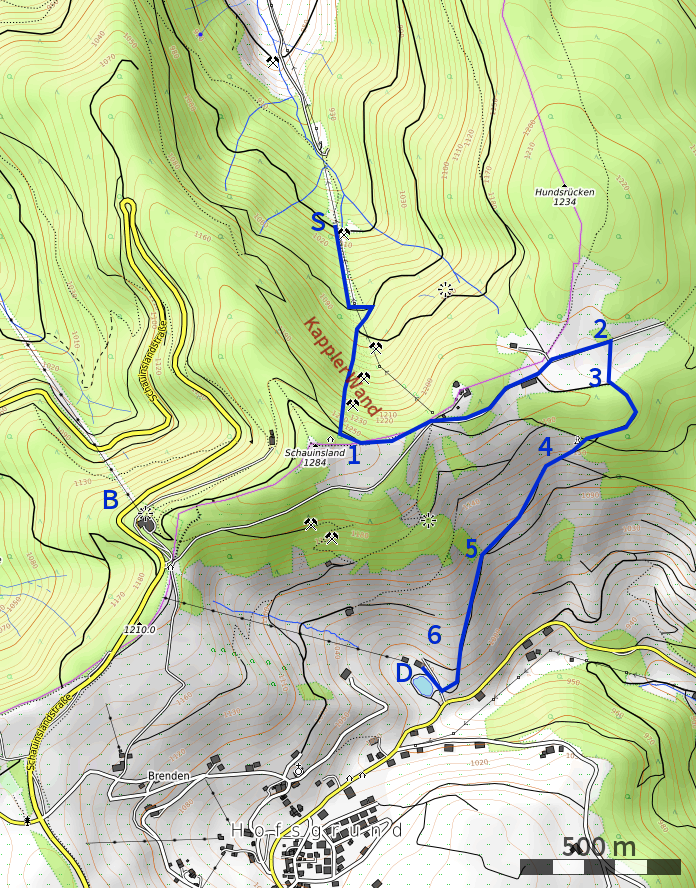
The group's route.: S: Meeting with postman Otto Steiert, then ascent up the Kappler Wand; 1: Arrival on ridge, driven eastward by the storm; 2: Point where the group probably first heard church bells and followed the sound.; 3: Place where Jack Eaton was found with two survivors; 4: Place where Francis Bourdillon and Roy Witham were found, together with Keast and another survivor; 5: Place where Peter Ellercamp was found, with one survivor; 6: Place where Stanley Lyons was found, just above Dobelhof; D: Dobelhof farmhouse; B: Peak station of the cable car (where the nearest shelter could have been found)

The snow was getting deeper above the Kappel valley and the group was struggling to move forward. The Schauinsland summit that they had planned to reach by noon still lay ahead, and progress through the waist-deep snow became difficult. Despite the worsening conditions, Keast decided to continue towards the summit and then descend to Hofsgrund, the next village, rather than return to the miners' hostel.

Travelling in a direct line, the upper Kappler valley is about one kilometre (5/8 mile) from the summit, and two kilometres (1 1/4 miles) to Hofsgrund. However, Keast had not taken the terrain into account: there was still about a 300-metre (1,000 ft) ascent to reach the summit. Heading in a straight line to the summit, the group were trying to climb the steepest flank of the mountain, the Kappler wall, which has a gradient of up to 70 percent. The difficult ascent through deep snow at temperatures around freezing point, drifting snow, and strong wind soon caused some of the children to collapse. Jack Alexander Eaton, the school's 14-year-old boxing champion, was the first to collapse. He was given an orange and a piece of cake and told to "buck up". Keast, still convinced that a direct route to Hofsgrund was the safest option, continued the ascent and let the boys sing cheerful songs to keep them happy. Those who could no longer stand on their feet were carried by others.

When the group finally reached the east crest of Schauinsland, they lost the shelter of the mountain and were completely exposed to the snowstorm at below-freezing temperatures. If they had gone westward, they could have reached the safety of the upper station of the Schauinsland cable car by a broadly level route. Because nothing could be seen in the fog and storm, Keast still attempted to reach Hofsgrund, probably unaware that this meant another 250 m (820 ft) of descent via steep, snow-covered terrain. Soon after, with daylight fading, the group lost their sense of direction on the southeastern mountain flank. They were driven east by the storm, away from Hofsgrund, which was due south.

=== Rescue ===
Around 18:30 the group was able to hear the evening ringing of the Hofsgrund church bells, indicating the direction to Hofsgrund. From an elevation of 1,100 m (3,600 ft) they descended below the fog and could see the lights of Hofsgrund.

The first members of the group arrived at the Dobelhof farmyard around 20:00. When they explained that there were others still on the mountain, an alarm was sounded. In response, all the men available at Hofsgrund set out on skis to search for them, since the boys could not clearly indicate the location of the rest of the group. After they were found it proved impossible to carry the children in the fresh deep snow, so a horn sled was used. Eventually, fifteen of the pupils reached the farm under their own power. Others kept watch over the collapsed boys and called for help, as Keast helped with two unconscious pupils.

A doctor on holiday near Hofsgrund provided emergency treatment. The boys were carefully warmed up and looked after by helpers. Shortly after 22:00, the police in Kirchzarten were contacted by telephone, and requested ambulances from Freiburg. By 23:30, all the hikers had been located. Police and ambulances, together with another doctor, the official mountain rescue team, and a search dog, did not arrive in Hofsgrund until after 01:00 because of the wintry road conditions.

== Casualties ==
Four members of the group could not be revived in Hofsgrund and were declared dead. Roy Witham and another pupil were transported by ambulance to the University Medical Center Freiburg. Witham died there ten minutes after arrival, but the other boy recovered quickly. The five deceased boys were Francis Bourdillon (12), Peter Ellercamp (13), Stanley Lyons (13), Jack Alexander Eaton (14) and Roy Witham (14).

The last three children to be found, including Eaton, were located just below the ridge. Since it seems unlikely that they could have for some reason climbed back up the mountain in their condition, it is reasonable to assume that they were left there when the group disbanded.

== Investigation ==
During the investigation in England, Keast stated that the planned route was usually considered as a short day-trip, and that German authorities had described the conditions as the worst snowstorm in forty years. Initially critical, the school management investigated why a group of this size was accompanied abroad by only one adult. Although extreme physical exertion as a part of physical education was normal at the time, Keast was reproached for not having recognised the emergency situation quickly enough, failing to keep the group together and not paying sufficient attention to the boys who had collapsed. The general lack of preparation for the hike and the inadequate equipment were also strongly criticised.

In Germany, the Nazi Party quickly took political advantage of the situation. The Olympic Games in Berlin were approaching and the German Reich wanted to present itself to the world as a strong but friendly and benevolent state. Thus, the official account adopted Keast's thesis of an unforeseeable weather disaster that had cost the boys their lives despite heroic efforts by their teacher. The vital role played by the villagers of Hofsgrund, as well as all suggestions of misconduct on the part of the teacher, were ignored. The lack of any action against Keast by the German authorities was diplomatically motivated: further grievances against the United Kingdom could have increased tensions, exacerbating the strained diplomatic relations since Hitler's rise to power — which would not have been welcome to either side. In this way Germany was able to present itself as a generous helper in times of need. Keast found this development very convenient, and the British government was also pleased.

== Aftermath ==
From the outset, Keast described the event to the press and authorities as an unforeseeable natural catastrophe. He had expected favourable spring weather, like the day before. He claimed that as soon as the weather deteriorated, he did his utmost to bring the group to safety. As a consequence of the incident, a subsequent school trip to Austria under Keast's leadership was cancelled, but in the end all accusations against him were dropped. He remained active in the teaching profession and died in 1971.

One of the rescued boys, Stanley C. Few, later joined the British Army, but told his superiors that he could not be expected to fight Germans as he credited them with saving his life. He was deployed in Asia.

=== Use as propaganda ===
The rescued pupils were taken to Freiburg on Saturday, where the Hitler Youth organised a leisure programme to keep them occupied. It was not until Sunday that most of them learned of the death of some of their fellow pupils. The German Reich also managed the return journey of the survivors to England and the transfer of the dead with military honours and a personal wreath in the name of Adolf Hitler.

Before that, a memorial event was staged for the benefit of the German and British public. A press photograph in which members of the Hitler Youth held "honour guard" at the coffins of the "fallen heroes and mountain comrades" was also printed in several English daily newspapers. In the following years the Hitler Youth revered the students who died in the accident as "fallen mountain comrades" who had given their lives in the fight for peace and international understanding.

== Reactions ==
Jack Alexander Eaton's father did not believe the official account. He travelled to Freiburg several times after the accident, traced the route, interviewed witnesses, reconstructed the events and found confirmation of his suspicions. In a written statement, which he distributed publicly as an appeal to bring Keast to justice, he summarised his investigations and accused Keast of having put the group of students in a hopeless situation out of ambition and recklessness, and of having ignored local advice not to attempt the hike out of disdain for the Germans. His statements were politically undesirable and found little attention, especially since they also blamed the tour operators and school management. Eaton publicly stated that Keast was his son's murderer and pursued him incessantly. The parents of the other victims did not join Eaton's protests.

== Rediscovery ==
Outside the Schauinsland region, the disaster was forgotten, until a Freiburg teacher and amateur historian, Bernd Hainmüller, came across it at the beginning of the 21st century while studying the history of the Hitler Youth in Freiburg. Since the depiction in records from the era was obviously politically influenced, he set about reconstructing the events from individual records and oral traditions. He presented his findings in Hofsgrund on 17 April 2016, the eightieth anniversary of the disaster. The findings disproved the official explanation of the disaster as a tragic accident caused by freak weather, and supported Jack Eaton's accusations of Keast's wilful ignorance and over-confidence. The astonishment of many that such an inadequately equipped group of schoolchildren had made it over the Schauinsland at all under the circumstances is still remembered in Hofsgrund.

It is still unclear what exactly happened on the "last mile", between the sound of the bells and the Dobelhof, as Hainmüller repeatedly pointed out. According to the rescuers, small groups of collapsed boys were found, each with an older boy as guard. But since there seemed little point in leaving exhausted students lying in the snow with a guard instead of carrying them to shelter, Hainmüller argued that Keast had completely lost control of the group by then, and that the group had broken up into separate squads, each of which tried to reach shelter on their own, leaving the exhausted behind. One of the twenty-one questions posed by Jack Eaton at the time asks which of the boys proved to be "true Englishmen" and helped weaker ones in need. What is certain is that there was secret collusion among Keast, the school management, and the survivors. Even after Keast's death in 1971, nothing has been revealed about the content of discussions.

Two daughters of one survivor, Kenneth Osborne, who had kept a diary throughout the trip, were present at Hainmüller's talk and reported that although their father had not often spoken about the tour, the kindness and helpfulness of the farmers had remained in his memory throughout his life. Osborne, 12, may have survived only because he had a borrowed rain cape with him to protect against the wind. All his life he had cherished a small cast model of a church, which his daughters identified as Freiburg Cathedral only when they visited it. In the following period Osborne created an extensive archive of all British newspaper reports about the accident that were available to him, a copy of which was given to Bernd Hainmüller.

On the 80th anniversary in 2016 British correspondent Kate Connolly published a detailed article in The Guardian describing Hainmüller's findings. In April 2026 descendants of the schoolboys and the Hofsgrund villagers marked the 90th anniversary.

== Monuments ==
On 30 September 2017, new information boards were attached to the two existing monuments on the slope, giving a brief outline of the event and the historical significance of the site.

=== Engländerdenkmal ===
The Engländerdenkmal memorial in Schauinsland was designed by Hermann Alker on behalf of Baldur von Schirach and the Hitler Youth and was dedicated on 12 October 1938. On a hexagonal platform surrounded by a wall stands a rune-like gate consisting of two pillars and a crossbeam. The pillars bear, on the left English and on the right German, a description of the accident—with no mention of the rescue operation by the villagers—and the names and dates of birth of the five deceased pupils. The English text incorrectly calls the victims "English Boy Scouts". The crossbeam originally bore an imperial eagle and swastika, which were removed after the Second World War.

=== Kleines Engländerdenkmal ===
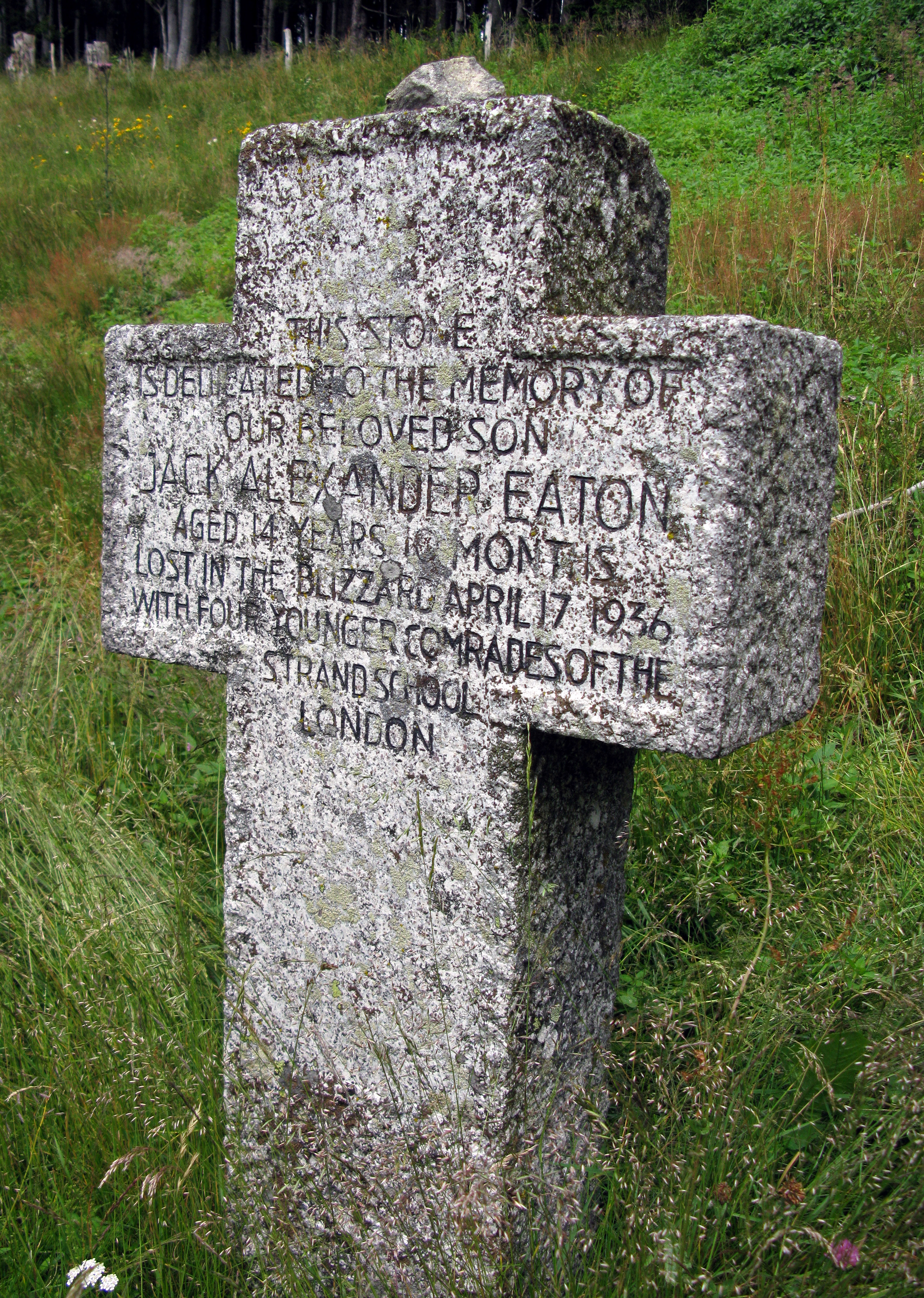
English text on the Kleines Engländerdenkmal

The Kleines Engländerdenkmal ("Small Englishmen Monument") or Eaton Cross is the name given to the stone memorial cross, about 1 m (3 ft 3 in) high, that Jack Alexander Eaton's father erected in May 1937 near the spot where his son was found dead. It bears a German inscription on the slope side and an English inscription on the valley side with the same content. Eaton's intention in erecting it was to express his protest against the official account of the event, which exonerated Keast from any culpability. He wanted the English text to conclude with the line, "Their teacher failed them in the hour of trial", but this was denied him, as it contradicted the official version of the events. The free space on the cross below the English text is clearly visible. In 2026, local authorities promised to inscribe the missing line to commemorate the 90th anniversary of the disaster.

=== Commemorative plaque ===
In the entrance area of the Hofsgrunder church, whose bell-ringing oriented the children and enabled them to alert the inhabitants, the parents of the rescued pupils had a commemorative plaque put up expressing gratitude to the Hofsgrunder inhabitants for their role in the rescue.
