= Breaking and Entering (film) =

2006 film by Anthony Minghella

- Theatrical release poster
- Directed by: Anthony Minghella
- Written by: Anthony Minghella
- Produced by: Timothy Bricknell; Anthony Minghella; Sydney Pollack
- Starring: Jude Law; Juliette Binoche; Robin Wright
- Cinematography: Benoît Delhomme
- Edited by: Lisa Gunning
- Music by: Gabriel Yared; Underworld
- Production companies: The Weinstein Company; Miramax Films; Mirage Enterprises
- Distributed by: Metro-Goldwyn-Mayer (United States; through MGM Distribution Co.); Buena Vista International (International)
- Release dates: 13 September 2006 (Toronto); 9 February 2007 (United States)
- Running time: 120 minutes
- Countries: United Kingdom; United States
- Language: English
- Box office: $8.9 million

Breaking and Entering is a 2006 romantic crime drama film written and directed by Anthony Minghella and starring Jude Law, Juliette Binoche, and Robin Wright. It was his first original screenplay since his 1990 feature debut Truly, Madly, Deeply and his final feature film before his death in 2008. Set in a blighted, inner-city neighbourhood of London, the film is about a successful landscape architect whose dealings with a young thief and his mother cause him to re-evaluate his life.

Minghella previously directed the film's stars – Jude Law in Cold Mountain and The Talented Mr. Ripley, and Juliette Binoche in The English Patient. In his first major film role, Rafi Gavron portrays Miro, the young traceur burglar, a role requiring several difficult physical feats. The film is a presentation of The Weinstein Company, Miramax Films and Mirage Enterprises and was distributed in the United States by Metro-Goldwyn-Mayer (through MGM Distribution Co.) and in international markets by Buena Vista International. Breaking and Entering premiered on 13 September 2006 at the Toronto International Film Festival before being released in the United States on 9 February 2007.

== Plot ==
Will Francis, a young Englishman, is a landscape architect living a detached, routine-based life in London with his Swedish-American girlfriend Liv and her autistic daughter Bea. The 14-year-old girl's irregular sleeping and eating habits as well as her unsocial behaviour (she has trouble relating to people and seems only interested in doing somersaults and gymnastics) reach worrying proportions and start to put a lot of strain on Will and Liv's relationship. Complicating the situation further is his feeling of being shut out of their inner circle since Bea is not his biological daughter. He and Liv start relationship counseling, but their drifting apart continues.

Simultaneously on the business front, Will's and his partner Sandy's state-of-the-art offices in the Kings Cross area are repeatedly burgled by a group of Slavic-language-speaking thieves. The thieves employ a 15-year-old traceur named Mirsad "Miro" whose acrobatic skills allow them to enter the building. Miro is actually a refugee from Bosnia and Herzegovina living with his Bosnian Muslim mother Amira (Juliette Binoche) who works as a seamstress, while his Serbian father got murdered during the war.

Though they're puzzled about the burglars' ability to disable the alarm, the two architects are not particularly worried after the first break-in, mostly writing it off to the neighbourhood's dodgy reputation. However, after the second break-in, they decide to stake out the building after hours hoping to find the culprit and alert the police. Being out of the house on nightly stakeouts actually suits Will just fine, allowing him to get away from the cold atmosphere of his household.

Will strikes up a strange acquaintance with an Eastern European prostitute named Oana (Vera Farmiga) who hangs around the area every night. Spotting Miro attempting to break in one night, Will attempts to follow him. This pursuit leads Will to the flat where Miro lives with his mother Amira. Realizing their modest living means, he decides not to report his findings to the police but goes back to Amira's apartment under the guise of having a suit that needs mending.

He soon becomes emotionally entangled with her, causing him to re-evaluate his life. Conflict arises when the police close in on the burglars, and Will must make a crucial choice which will affect the lives of everyone around him.

== Cast ==
- Jude Law as Will Francis
- Juliette Binoche as Amira Simić
- Robin Wright as Liv
- Romi Aboulafia as Orit
- Rafi Gavron as Mirsad "Miro" Simić
- Martin Freeman as Sandy Hoffman
- Juliet Stevenson as Rosemary McCloud
- Ed Westwick as Zoran
- Velibor Topic as Vlado
- Rad Lazar as Dragan
- Poppy Rogers as Beatrice "Bea"
- Anna Chancellor as Kate
- Mark Benton as Legge
- Ray Winstone as Bruno Fella
- Vera Farmiga as Oana
- Ting-Ting Hu as Wei Ping
- O-T Fagbenle as Joe

== Production ==
=== Filming locations ===
The film centres on the area of King's Cross, London. The filming location for Amira's flat is Rowley Way, South Hampstead, London. Since a suitable location near Kings Cross couldn't be found, Will's office was recreated in an old foundry located in Dace Road, by the Old Ford Lock, in the London Borough of Tower Hamlets. Other locations include:

- Alexandra Palace, Haringey, London, England (Miro and the cop)
- Camden Market, London, England
- Hackney Wick, London, England
- Hungerford Bridge, London, England (sunset)
- King's Cross Station, King's Cross, London, England
- Muswell Hill, Haringey, London, England
- Primrose Hill, London, England (sunset)
- Rowley Way, South Hampstead, London, England (Amira's flat)
- St. Pancras Station, St. Pancras, London, England

=== Soundtrack ===
Gabriel Yared and Underworld collaborated on the film's original music score.

== Reception ==
Breaking and Entering received mixed reviews from film critics, with review aggregator website Rotten Tomatoes giving the film a 34% rating based on 130 film critic reviews. The site's consensus reads: "This class warfare drama feels contrived and superficial: characters don't act logically as the movie manipulates them towards deconstructing various social issues." On Metacritic, the film holds a 56 out of 100 rating, based on 27 reviews.
