= Pearl Jephcott =

English social researcher and girls' club organiser

- Born: 1 May 1900; Alcester, England
- Died: 9 November 1980 (aged 80); Chipping Norton, England
- Occupations: Administrator, organiser

Academic background
- Education: University of Wales

Academic work
- Main interests: Underrepresented communities (women, migrants, the poor, etc.)

Agnes Pearl Jephcott (1 May 1900 – 9 November 1980), known by her middle name Pearl, was an English social researcher and girls' club organiser.

== Early life, education and girls' club organising ==
Jephcott was born on 1 May 1900 in Alcester, Warwickshire, the youngest child of Agnes Amelia (née Boobbyean) and Edward Arthur Jephcott, an auctioneer. After attending Alcester Grammar School, she studied at the University of Wales, Aberystwyth, graduating in 1922 with a Bachelor of Arts degree in history. She worked in teaching, as a secretary, and for Dr Barnardo's homes, before becoming involved in the girls' club movement. She joined the Birmingham Union of Girls' Clubs and became its organising secretary in 1927 and eight years later became the temporary County Organiser for the National Association of Girls' Clubs. During the Second World War, she became a National Organiser and moved to London.

== Social research and later years ==
In 1942, Jephcott was given leave by the National Association of Girls' Clubs to carry out research into girls' experiences of growing up in England and Wales. She collected information on the work and home life, leisure and relationships of 153 girls aged 14 to 18, the results of which were reported in Jephcott's first book: Girls Growing Up (1942). She followed this up the next year with Clubs for Girls, which provided a guide on organising clubs. She was awarded a Barnett Fellowship to carry out a follow-up study of the girls she spoke to in 1942, and produced Rising Twenties in 1948 as a result. She then worked for Political and Economic Planning, before joining the University of Nottingham in 1950 to oversee research projects, one of which examined youth groups and was published as Some Young People (1954). That year she became a senior research assistant at the London School of Economics, working under Richard Titmuss alongside Nancy Seear and John Smith. They investigated married women in employment in Bermondsey and she focused on home life. The result was Married Women Working, published in 1962. In the view of Helen McCarthy, this study meant that Jephcott was one of a number of researchers in the 1950s and early 1960s (such as Seear, Viola Klein, Ferdynand Zweig, Judith Hubback and Hannah Gavron) who "helped to entrench new understandings of married women’s employment as a fundamental feature of advanced industrial societies, and one that solved the dilemmas of 'modern' woman across social classes."

Jephcott was also a member of the Central Advisory Council for Education in England for the year 1957–58 and sat on the Albemarle Committee in 1958. She left the London School of Economics and studied families in Notting Hill, London, leading to a report, A Troubled Area in 1964, which highlighted the scarcity of resources for disadvantaged people in an area which also witnessed substantial immigration from Commonwealth countries.

She studied young people's leisure interests while working at the University of Glasgow and produced Time of One's Own in 1967 and then Homes in High Flats four years later, which analysed the experiences of residents in Glasgow's high-rise social housing. She left the University in 1970 and travelled abroad to carry out UNICEF research; from 1973 to 1975 she carried out research into high-rise flats in Birmingham.

On 9 November 1980, Jephcott died at the War Memorial Hospital, Chipping Norton.

== Resurgence ==
In 2023, Routledge re-issued five of Jephcott's books. Professor John Goodwin, University of Leicester, a champion of Jephcott's innovative and creative work, contributed introductory essays to each volume.
