= Kraków School of Economics =

School of economic theory

Kraków School of Economics, also known as the Kraków School or KSE, was a school of economic thought centred around the Jagiellonian University and most prominent in interwar Poland. The school was critical of economic interventionism and statism prominent during the sanation and instead favoured free markets and free trade.

Some of the school's members, such as Adam Heydel and Roman Rybarski were tied to the national democratic movement.

The school had connections to the Austrian School, and Adam Heydel adopted a similar methodology.

== List of members ==
- Adam Heydel
- Adam Krzyżanowski
- Ferdynand Zweig
- Julian Dunajewski
- Leon Oberlender
- Roman Rybarski
- Stanisław Wyrobisz
- Stefan Schmidt
- Włodzimierz Czerkawski

== See also ==
- Liberalism in Poland
- National liberalism
- Janusz Korwin-Mikke
