= Companies' Remuneration Reports Bill =

Proposed UK Act of Parliament

The Companies' Remuneration Reports Bill was a 2008 proposed United Kingdom act of Parliament, which aimed to amend the Companies Act 2006. It was moved from the House of Lords by Lord Gavron.

A short piece of legislation, it proposed to add a new section 430A to the Companies Act 2006. The bill would have required directors of public companies listed on the stock exchange in their annual Director Remuneration Report to disclose a statistical comparison between the salaries of the highest paid person in the company and the average pay of the lowest paid 10% workers of the company.

The purpose of the bill follows that of all reporting requirements, which is to enhance transparency. This may mean that shareholders have increased information by which to hold the board to account. It can also be useful for stakeholders that do not currently have voting rights within the company.

The proposed provision stated the following:

430A Annual accounts and report: public quoted companies

(1) Every public quoted company, as defined in sections 4(2), 385(1) and (2), shall publish on the first page of the chairman’s statement, chief executive’s statement, or directors’ report, whichever comes first in the annual accounts and report, the ratio between the total annual remuneration of the highest paid director or executive and the total annual average remuneration of the lowest paid ten per cent of the workforce.

(2) The ratio referred to in subsection (1) shall appear in bold type on the first page of the chairman’s statement, chief executive’s statement or directors’ report.

(3) The total annual remuneration of the highest paid director or executive and the total annual average remuneration of the lowest paid ten per cent of the workforce shall also appear in bold type in the text of the annual accounts.

(4) In this section, “remuneration” includes the information specified in Schedule 8 to the Large and Medium-sized Companies and Groups (Accounts and Reports) Regulations 2008 (S.I. 2008/410).

(5) In this section, “the lowest paid ten per cent of the workforce” means the ten per cent of people who have been on the company’s payroll during the previous financial year and received the lowest annual remuneration.

(6) The remuneration of any person employed on a part-time basis, or not employed for the full year, shall be calculated on a pro-rata basis.

(7) The requirement to publish the ratio, as stated in subsection (1), applies equally to electronic versions of the report and the term “publish” shall be construed accordingly.
