= Schauinsland Pit =

Mine in Germany

Coordinates: 47°54′35″N 7°53′54″E

Schauinsland Pit Grube Schauinsland
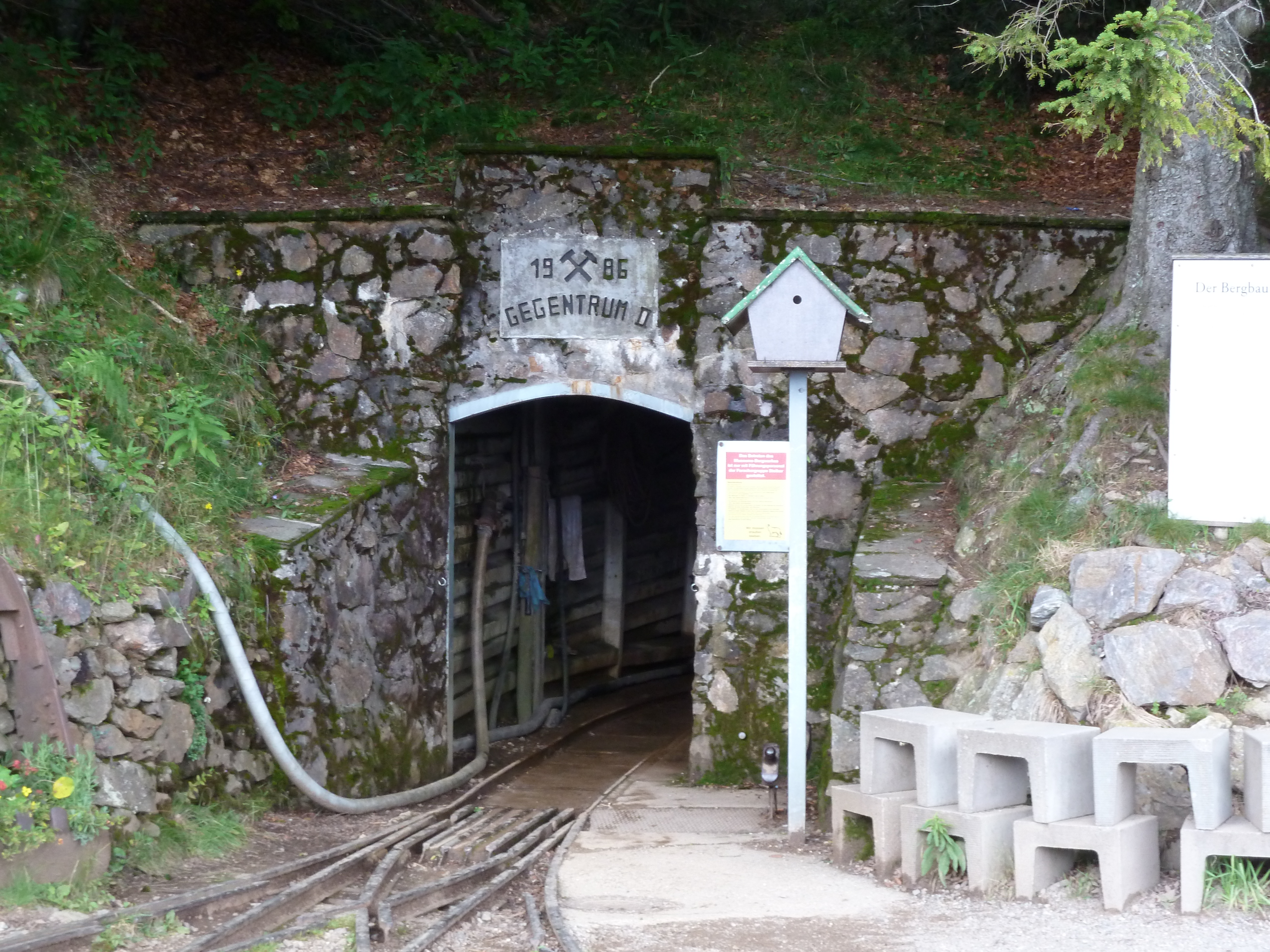

- Location within Germany
- Opened: 13th century
- Active: Erzkasten
- Closed: 1954

The Schauinsland Pit (German: Grube Schauinsland, or Erzkasten in the 19th century) was a silver and lead mine east of Freiburg im Breisgau. From the 19th century zinc was also mined. The mine operated from the 13th century until 1954. Since 1997 Schauinsland Pit has been a show mine.

== Geology ==
The pit lies in the southern part of the Central Black Forest, immediately south of the 1,284-metre-high peak of Schauinsland. There are numerous lodes which descend very steeply from east to west and run largely parallel to the Upper Rhine Graben. The lodes are formed from quartz, baryte and carbonate and contain exploitable quantities of zincblende and galena. The host rocks are gneisses and migmatites. The exploitable main lodes lie within an area 1.7 km wide and 3.4 km long around the summit of the Schauinsland. Mining has been carried out at up to 900 metres deep.

== Literature ==
- Wolfgang Werner, Volker Dennert: Lagerstätten und Bergbau im Schwarzwald. Published by the State Office for Geology, Raw Materials and Mining, Baden-Württemberg, Freiburg im Breisgau, 2004, ISBN 3-00-014636-9.
- Martin Straßburger: Bergbau im Schauinsland vom späten Mittelalter bis um 1800. Zeitschrift für Archäologie des Mittelalters, Jg. 31, 2003, pp. 212–213
- Martin Straßburger: Bergbau im Schauinsland vom späten Mittelalter bis um 1800. Tagungsband zum 7. Internationalen Bergbauworkshop 2004 Clausthal-Zellerfeld, St. Andreasberg/Clausthal-Zellerfeld 2004, pp. 105–109
- Martin Straßburger: Bergbau im Schauinsland vom späten Mittelalter bis um 1800. Schau-ins-Land, 126. Jahrheft, 2007, pp. 69–88
- Martin Straßburger: Montanarchäologie und Wirtschaftsgeschichte des Bergbaus im Schauinsland vom 13. Jahrhundert bis um 1800. Universitätsforschungen zur Prähistorischen Archäologie, Vol. 275, Verlag Dr. Rudolf Habelt, Bonn, 2015, ISBN 978-3-7749-3969-1
- Martin Straßburger: Mining in the Schauinsland from the late Middle Ages until about 1800. In Jacquo Silvertant (ed.), Echoes of a Mining Past. Yearbook of the Institute Europa Subterranea 2018, Kelmis/Gulpen 2018, Silvertant Erfgoedprojecten, ISBN 978-90-823515-9-0, pp. 35–85

== See also ==
- List of show mines
- Barbarastollen Schauinsland
