= Józef Supiński =

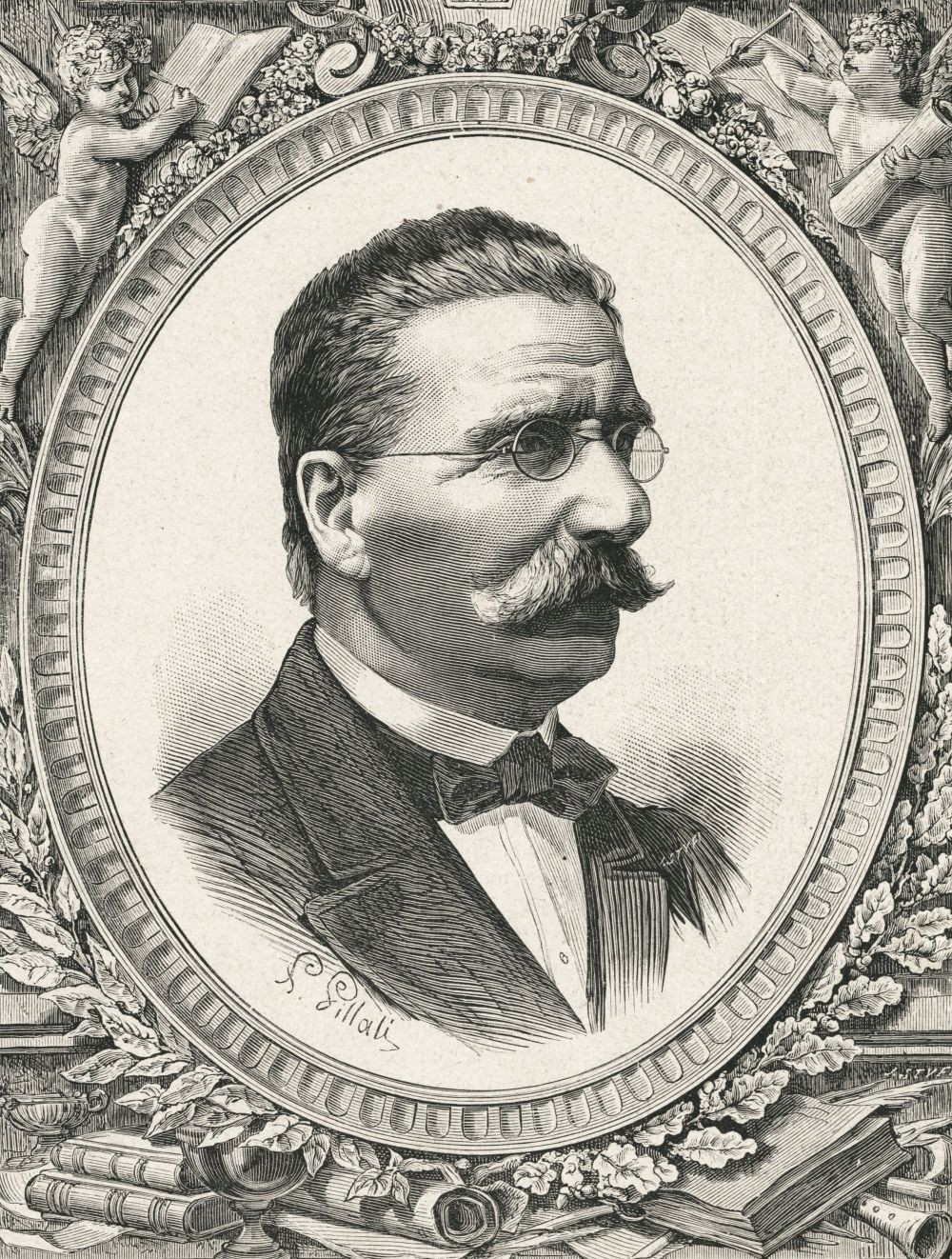

Józef Supiński (village of Romanów, near Lwów, 21 February 1804 – 16 February 1893, Lwów) was a Polish philosopher, jurist, economist and sociologist.

== Life ==
A student at Warsaw University, Supiński in 1831 left for Paris, because he had participated in the November 1830 Uprising and feared repressions by the Russian authorities. In France, he worked as a factory manager. In 1844 he returned to Poland, settling in Lwów, where he remained until his death.

Supiński coined the expression "praca organiczna" ("organic work"), which was the foundation of Polish Positivism in the latter 19th century.

== See also ==
- History of philosophy in Poland
- List of Poles
