= Adam Heydel =

Polish economist (1893–1941)

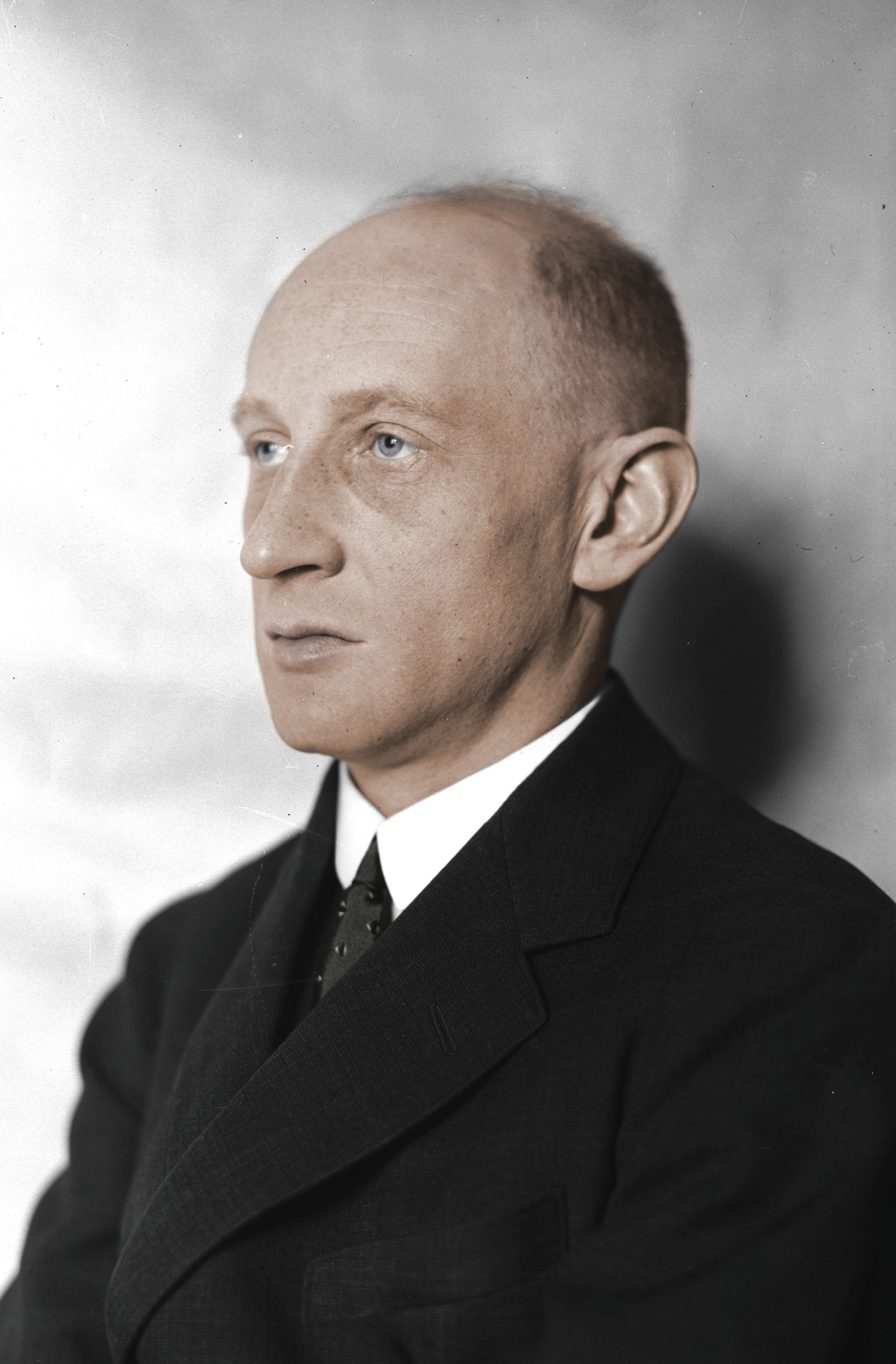
- Born: December 6, 1893; Stare Gardzienice, Kingdom of Poland, Russian Empire
- Died: March 14, 1941 (aged 47); Auschwitz-Birkenau, General Government, NS Germany

Academic background
- Education: Jagiellonian University
- Influences: Say · Mill · Menger · Marshall · Böhm-Bawerk · Krzyżanowski · Mises · Hayek · Schumpeter

Academic work
- School or tradition: Kraków School of Economics; Austrian School of Economics

Adam Zdzisław Heydel (December 6, 1893 – March 14, 1941) was a Polish economist and representative of the Cracow School of Economics, a type of economic liberalism.

== Biography ==
=== Early life and education ===
Adam Heydel was the son of Zdzisław and Maria Heydel, his brother named Wojciech. He was a student at John III Sobieski High School and later studied in Moscow and Kiev. In 1922 he studied law at the Jagiellonian University, where he got his doctorate. In the years 1921–1922 he worked in the Ministry of Foreign Affairs. In 1925 he got a habilitation in the field of political economy. Two years later he became a lecturer of economics at the Jagiellonian University.

=== Scholarly work and political activism ===
Together with Adam Krzyżanowski and Ferdinand Zweig he became a follower of the Cracow School of Economics, which advocated free market reforms. Heydel was familiar with western economic developments, particularly with the Austrian School and the economists of Ludwig von Mises and Friedrich von Hayek. He criticised the arguments concerning the general level of prices made by Joseph Schumpeter despite his personal friendship with him, as well as the monetary doctrines of Irving Fisher.

Heydel considered himself a nationalist and was sympathetic to the National Democratic movement and in the years 1930–1931 he led the National club in Cracow. He was critical of Sanation and due to this he was removed from the economics department at the Jagiellonian University and proceeded to become a director of the economics institute at the Academy of Learning.

=== Second World War ===
Heydel was arrested on 6 November 1939 as a part of the operations of Sonderaktion Krakau and with other academics he was placed Sachsenhausen concentration camp. Due to international pressure Heydel was released from the camp together with other academics which reached 40 years of age. After his release he got involved in the Union of Armed Struggle and on 23 of January 1941 he was arrested by the Gestapo.

After refusing to sign the Volksliste he was moved to Auschwitz where he was murdered in a mass-shooting.

== Works ==
- Podstawowe zagadnienia metodologiczne ekonomii (1925)
- Kapitalizm i socjalizm wobec etyki (1927)
- Pogląd na rozwój teoretycznej ekonomii” (1929)
- Czy i jak wprowadzić liberalizm ekonomiczny? (1931)
- Pojęcie produktywności (1934)
- Teoria dochodu społecznego (1935).

== See also ==
- Ferdynand Zweig
- Janusz Korwin-Mikke
