= Ferdynand Zweig =

Polish sociologist and economist

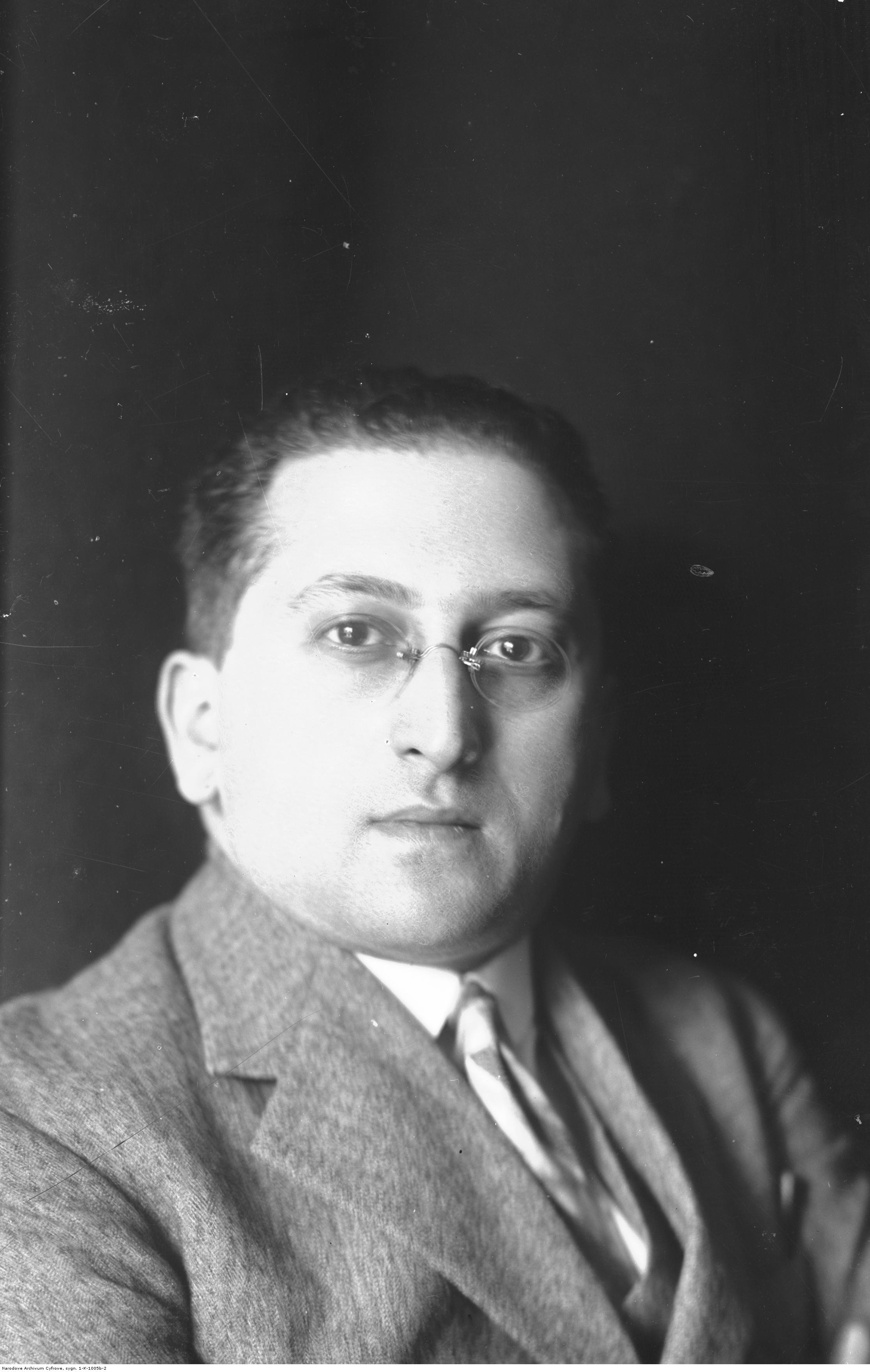
- Born: 23 June 1896; Kraków, Congress Poland
- Died: 9 June 1988 (aged 91)
- Citizenship: Polish; British (1948-1988)

Academic background
- Education: Jagiellonian University
- Influences: Adam Heydel

Academic work
- Discipline: Economics, Sociology
- School or tradition: Kraków School of Economics
- Notable ideas: Embourgeoisement thesis

Ferdynand Zweig (23 June 1896 – 9 June 1988) was a Polish sociologist and economist noted for his studies of the British working classes.

== Life in Poland ==
Zweig was born in 1896 in the Polish city of Krakow into a middle-class Jewish family. He studied at the Universities of Krakow and Vienna, took a Doctor of Law degree, and taught economics in Poland in the 1930s, eventually being appointed to the Chair of Political Economy at the University of Krakow. He and his family escaped the country during the German occupation in 1939, fleeing through Romania, France and the Soviet Union, but one daughter, Irène was captured in Besançon (France) in july 1942 and transported from the camp of Pithiviers to Auschwitz, the Nazi death camps.

== Sociological career and later life ==
Zweig arrived in the United Kingdom and became the economic adviser to the Polish government-in-exile headed by General Władysław Sikorski, while also authoring Poland Between Two Wars and The Planning of Free Societies. During the war, he also worked as a lecturer at the Polish Faculty of Law at the University of Oxford; it closed down in 1947, and he was later a Simon Research Fellow at the University of Manchester.

After the war, Seebohm Rowntree commissioned Zweig to study spending habits and poverty, which formed the basis of a book, Labour, Life and Poverty (1948). This was followed by Men in the Pits (1948), The British Worker (1952) and Women's Life and Labour. Zweig's post-war books—especially The British Worker and Women's Life and Labour—"established his reputation as a social chronicler", according to The Times. He went on to produce The Worker in Affluent Society in 1961, in which he argued that material affluence was leading to the disappearance of a "culturally distinct working class". This became known as the embourgeoisement thesis and would later be refuted by the University of Cambridge's Affluent Worker study. Zweig also wrote The Student in the Age of Anxiety in 1963, and The Quest for Fellowship two years later. He produced a study of Cumbernauld New Town, questioning the rationale behind the schemes, and also, in 1976, wrote The New Acquisitive Society for the New Right Centre for Policy Studies wherein he critiqued aspects of the Welfare State. While he held visiting professorships in Israel, he produced The Israeli Worker (1959) and The Sword and the Harp (1969).

In the view of Helen McCarthy, Zweig's studies of working-class men were related to the concerns of other post-war social researchers like Brian Jackson, Dennis Marsden and Peter Willmott, "all deeply absorbed in the 'male melodrama of the upwardly mobile'"; Zweig's studies of women in work, however, reflected interests not shared with those men. McCarthy argues that Zweig was one of a number of researchers in the 1950s (such as Viola Klein, Pearl Jephcott, Judith Hubback, Nancy Seear and Hannah Gavron) who "helped to entrench new understandings of married women's employment as a fundamental feature of advanced industrial societies, and one that solved the dilemmas of 'modern' woman across social classes."

Zweig had been naturalised as a British subject in 1948; he was married twice, firstly to Dora, who predeceased him, and secondly to Ruth who survived him, along with his daughter Eve, who married the pianist Peter Katin. Zweig died on 9 June 1988.
