= Stanisław Smolka =

Polish historian (1854–1924)

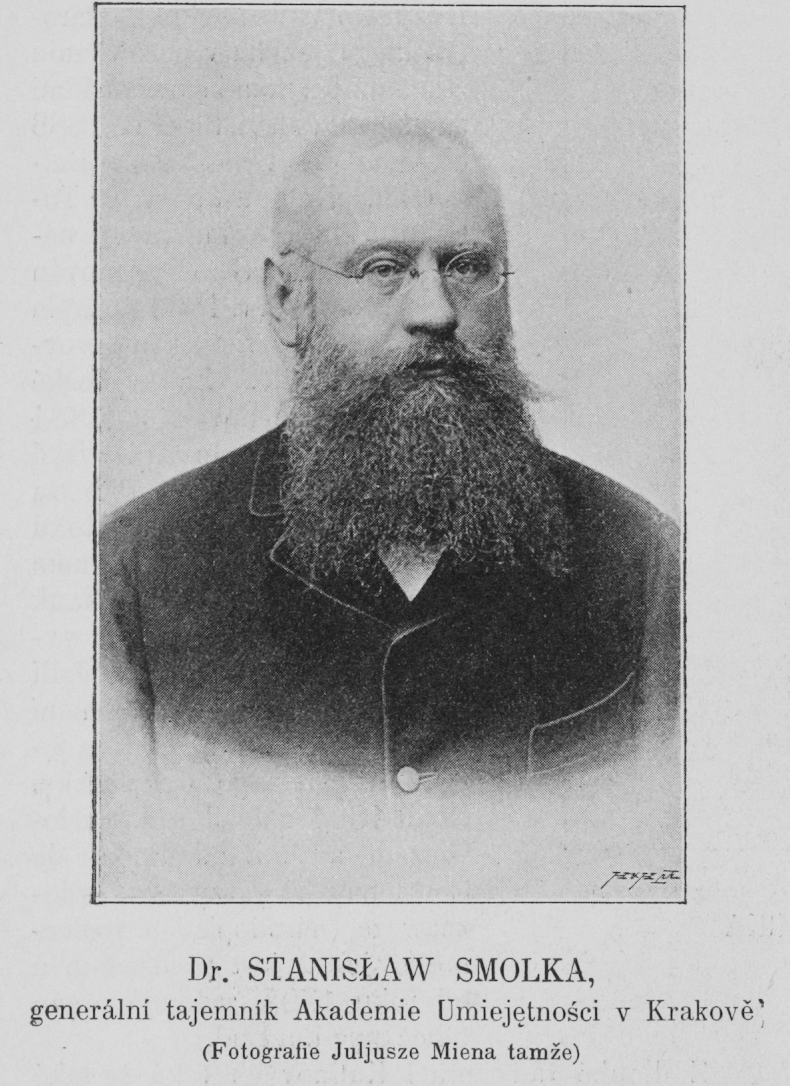
Stanisław Smolka photographed by Juliusz Mien in 1898

Stanisław Smolka (29 June 1854 in Lwów – 27 August 1924 in Nowoszyce) was a Polish historian and publicist, professor at the Jagiellonian University and the Catholic University of Lublin, Secretary General of the Polish Academy of Arts and Sciences.

== Biography ==
He was born into the family of a Polish lawyer and independence activist Franciszek Smolka and Leokadia née Bekier (Bäcker von Salzheim) in Lviv. He graduated from the Franz Josef Gymnasium Lviv, then attended the University of Lviv, and took up studies in Göttingen. At the age of 19 in 1873, he received his doctorate from Professor Georg Waitz for his work Polnische Annalen bis zum Anfange des vierzehten Jahrhunderts. A year earlier he had published in Polish a work by Henryk Brodaty. An account of the history of the Piast era.

In March 1874, he was appointed to the Historical Commission of the Academy of Arts and Sciences. In September 1874, he took the position of secretary of the Scientific Department at the Ossoliński National Institute in Lviv. In 1875 the Faculty of Philosophy of the Jagiellonian University accepted his application for habilitation. In 1876, at the age of 22, he received the degree of associate professor of the history of Austria. In 1880 he obtained a full professorship.

After the death of Józef Szujski, he took over the chair of Polish history at Jagiellonian University in 1883. In 1890-1902 he served as Secretary General of the Academy of Arts and Sciences. And in 1896-1898 he served as rector of the Jagiellonian University. At the same time, he was active as a publicist, working as head of the literary section of the "Czas" newspaper, and from 1883-1887 as its editor.

In 1902, he began to experience health problems, including arthritis and nervous disease, which slowed his scientific work and forced him to resign from most of his positions. He started returning to work in 1905. In 1907, he became the director of the National Archives of Town and Land Acts in Kraków, and in 1912, he became the director of the Czartoryski Museum in Kraków.

After the outbreak of World War I, he became involved in political activities. In 1915, he traveled to Italy on behalf of the Supreme National Committee. In 1917 he began working at the Ministry of Religious Affairs and Public Education. After Poland regained independence, he took over the chair of Polish history at the newly established Catholic University of Lublin. He donated his book collection and part of the archive to this school.

He died on 27 August 1924 in Nowoszyce estate (today's Belarus), which belonged to his daughter Maria, widow of Karol Orda.

== Works and scientific achievements ==
In 1881, he published one of his most important works, Mieszko the Old and His Age, which started a great scholarly discussion on the shape of Polish society in the early Middle Ages, in which, in addition to Smolka, Michał Bobrzyński and Franciszek Piekosiński participated. He also published a number of works on Lithuanian history, most notably the 1889 work Kęstutis and Jogaila and The Oldest Monuments of Ruthenian-Lithuanian Historiography. A Critical Survey of 1890.

In 1916 he published his work Die Reussische Welt: Historisch-Politische Studien, Vergangenheit und Gegenwart, in which he had denied the right for existence of the separate sovereign Ukrainian nation. He envisioned it only as part of All-Russian nation, calling national and state autonomy as utopia. While ongoing national revival he suggested should be used and allowed only within the interests of Polish statehood.

He educated many prominent historians, including: Alfred Blumenstock-Halban, Franciszek Bujak, Stanisław Kętrzyński, Jan Karol Kochanowski, Feliks Koneczny, Stanisław Krzyżanowski, Stanisław Kutrzeba, Wacław Sobieski, Wacław Tokarz, Bolesław Ulanowski, Stanisław Zakrzewski.

== Family ==
Smolka married on July 21, 1877, Maria Kremer, daughter of Józef Kremer, with whom he had two daughters, Maria (born 1878), wife of Karol Orda, and Jadwiga (1880-1966). After her death, he married Wanda Maria Orda on September 21. From his second marriage he had four sons. Two of them, Stanisław (1891-1915) and Karol (1893-1916), died in Austrian service during World War I, Witold died after two surgical operations (1893-1909). The oldest Kazimierz was captured by the Russians in the Battle of the Vistula River and spent several years in Siberia, after returning he dealt with the administration of landholdings.
