= Robert Gavron, Baron Gavron =

British printing millionaire, philanthropist and Labour life peer

The Right Honourable The Lord Gavron CBE FRSL
- Gavron in 2012

Member of the House of Lords
- Lord Temporal
- Life peerage 6 August 1999 – 7 February 2015

Personal details
- Born: 13 September 1930
- Died: 7 February 2015 (aged 84)
- Party: Labour
- Spouse(s): Hannah Fyvel (m. 1955; died 1965) Nicky Coates (m. 1967; div. 1987) Kate Macnair (m. 1989)
- Children: Simon Gavron; Jeremy Gavron; Sarah Gavron

Robert Gavron, Baron Gavron CBE FRSL (13 September 1930 – 7 February 2015) was a British printing millionaire, philanthropist and a Labour life peer.

== Early life and education ==
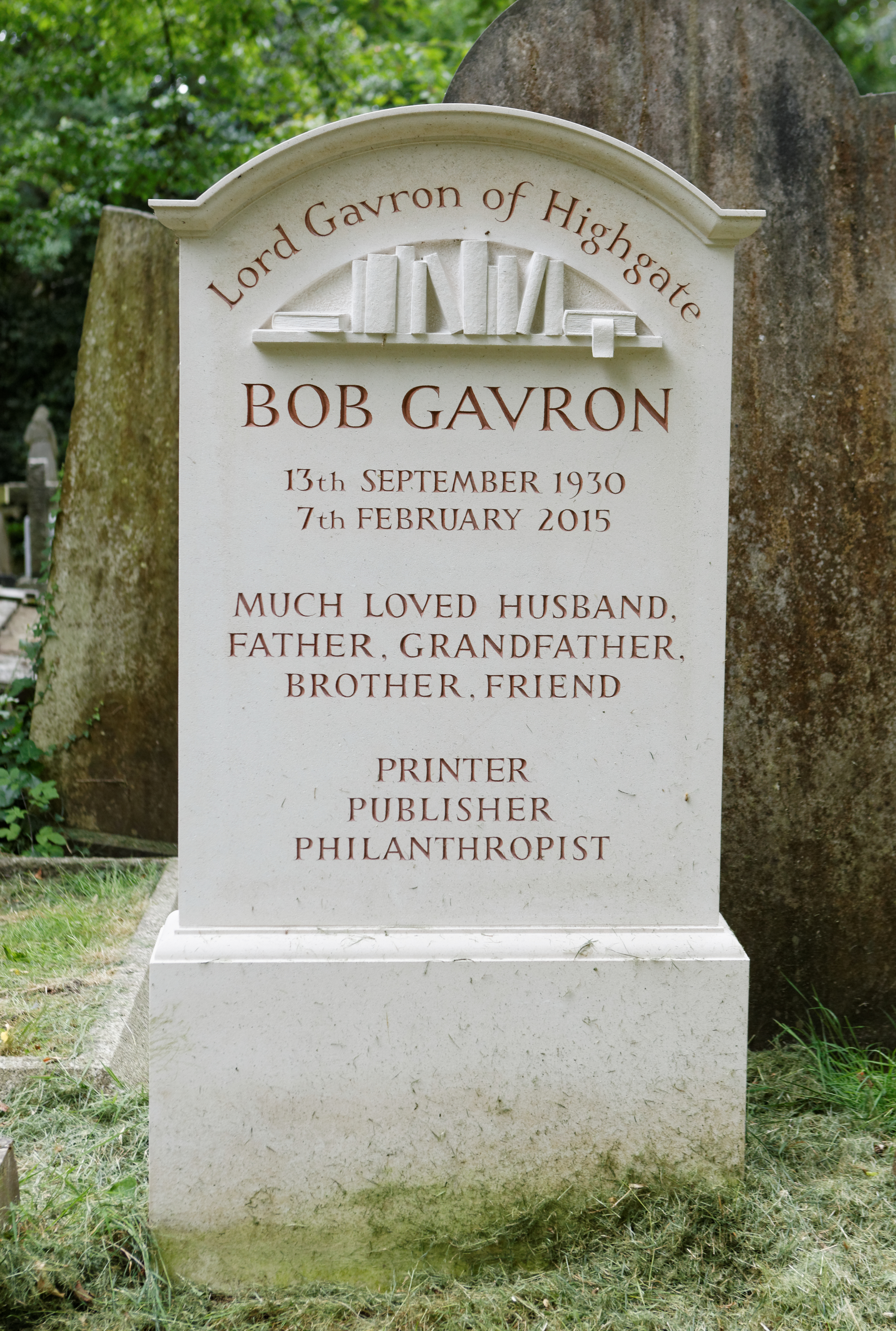
Gavron's grave in Highgate Cemetery

Gavron was the eldest son of Nathan Gavron, a patent lawyer, and Leah Gavron. His parents were secular, middle-class Jews who had immigrated to London from Russia and Lithuania. He was brought up in Hampstead Garden Suburb, north London, and studied at Leighton Park School in Reading and then at St Peter's College, Oxford. Gavron became a barrister and was called to the bar by Middle Temple in 1955.

== Career ==
Gavron borrowed £5,000 to purchase a failing publishing house in 1964. He renamed it the St Ives Group and served as chairman from 1964 to 1993, taking it public in 1985 and growing it into a £350m company. Gavron's savvy management of St Ives included developing a positive workplace culture through friendly relationships with his employees and industry unions.

He was the director of Octopus Publishing between 1975 and 1987 and Electra Management from 1981 to 1992. He was also the proprietor of the Carcanet Press from 1983 to 2015 and served as the chairman of the Folio Society, (1982–2015) and the National Gallery Co Ltd (1996–1998). He was both chairman of the Guardian Media Group and a trustee of the Scott Trust between 1997 and 2000.

Gavron was chairman of the Open College of the Arts (1991–1996), a director of the Royal Opera House (1992–1998), a trustee of the National Gallery (1994–2001), and of the Paul Hamlyn Foundation (1987–2005). He was a governor of the London School of Economics (1997–2002) and chaired his own charitable trust, the Robert Gavron Charitable Trust (1974–2015). He was in 1996 elected an Honorary Fellow of the Royal Society of Literature.

== Politics ==
Gavron was active in the Labour Party and a financial contributor to the Labour Leader's Office Fund, run by Lord Levy, which financed Tony Blair's private office before the 1997 General Election. He was also a trustee of the centre-left Institute of Public Policy Research from 1991 and the treasurer from 1994; during that time, the IPPR was influential in policy debates in the Labour Party which came to power in 1997.

He was appointed a Commander of the Order of the British Empire (CBE) in the 1990 Birthday Honours, and received a life peerage as Baron Gavron, of Highgate in the London Borough of Camden, on 6 August 1999. Gavron served on House of Lords, UK Parliament, Works of Art Committee from 1999 to 2003 and 2005 – 2009. Gavron was a member of the Groucho and the MCC.

== Personal life ==
Gavron was married three times. In 1955, he married Hannah Fyvel, the daughter of T. R. Fyvel who was literary editor of Tribune and The Jewish Chronicle. They had two sons before she took her own life in 1965. One son, Jeremy Gavron, a novelist, has written a book about the tragedy.

In 1967, Gavron married Felicia Nicolette Coates, who later became a Labour member of the London Assembly, and was later known as Nicky Gavron. Before they divorced in 1987, the couple had two daughters including the film director Sarah Gavron. In 1989, Gavron married Katherine Gardiner (née Macnair).

An MCC member, Gavron was a great supporter of cricket, especially in Barbados where he was an honorary life member of the Barbados Cricket Association. He established the Lord Gavron Scholarship for promising young cricketers in 2001. Recipients are presented with a trophy, a computer, cricket equipment and an attachment to a cricket club overseas or the opportunity to study at a local institution. Since 2010 two players, usually winners of the award, have spent a season with Sefton Park and Wavertree cricket clubs in England. Winners of the award who have gone on to play Test cricket for the West Indies include Kemar Roach, Kraigg Brathwaite, Jason Holder, Jomel Warrican, Shane Dowrich and Shai Hope.

Having survived cancer and heart surgery, Gavron died of a heart attack on 7 February 2015 after playing tennis.

== See also ==
- Companies' Remuneration Reports Bill
