= Neuburg (Freiburg im Breisgau) =

- Quarter of Freiburg
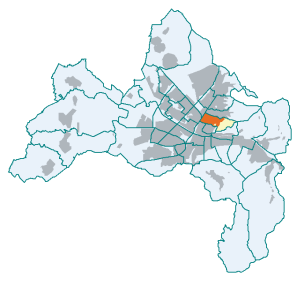
- Location of Neuburg in Freiburg
- Interactive map of Neuburg
- Location within Germany Location within Baden-Württemberg
- Coordinates: 48°0′9″N 7°51′11″E
- Country: Germany
- State: Baden-Württemberg
- City: Freiburg

Area
  - Total: 1.64 km^{2} (0.63 sq mi)
- Elevation: 270 m (890 ft)

Population (2020-12-31)
  - Total: 5,090
  - Density: 3,100/km^{2} (8,040/sq mi)
- Time zone: UTC+01:00 (CET)
  - Summer (DST): UTC+02:00 (CEST)
- Postal codes: 79104,79106

Neuburg (German pronunciation: [ˈnɔʏbʊʁk]) is a quarter of the German city Freiburg im Breisgau. The district is located directly north of the old town with its numerous sights and includes the Schlossberg which is situated east of the city's historic center. Neuburg adjoins the district Oberau on wooded Schlossberg, as well as it adjoins Herdern in the north. On its western side, the district is cut off from Stühlinger by the tracks of the Rheintalbahn running from Mannheim to Basel.

The district's name Neuburg is rarely used by Freiburg's inhabitants since Neuburg is split into two-halves by the major street Habsburger Street. The area east of Habsburger Street is commonly viewed as part of the district Herdern, whereas the area west of it is said to be part of the Institutsviertel (engl. institute district), which comprises the local University's Natural sciences department.

== History ==
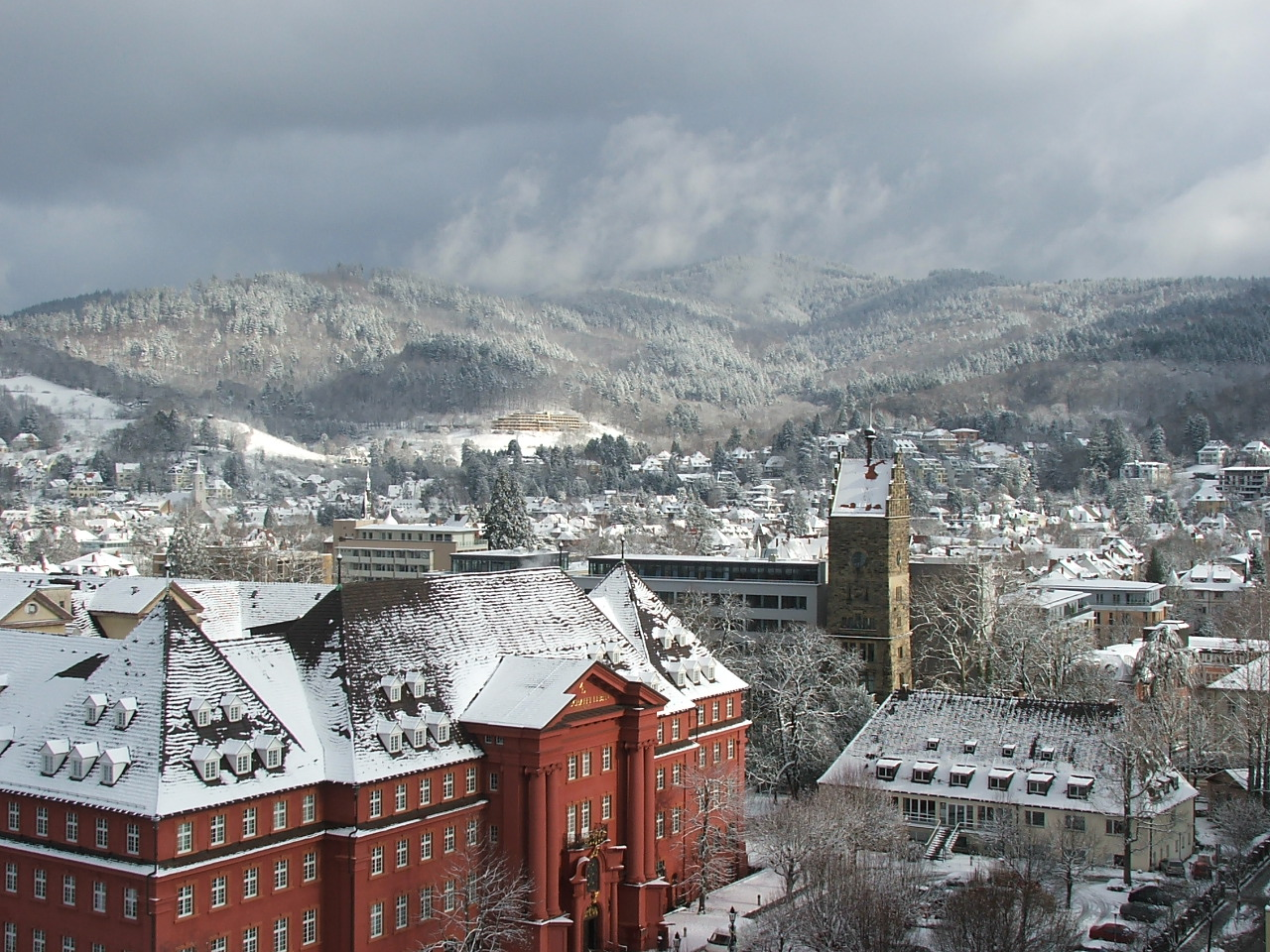
Herder-Verlagsgebäude in Neuburg and Black Forest in the background.

The first construction of houses in Neuburg started soon after the foundation of Freiburg in the 12th century. The district then constituted a northern suburb to Freiburg's city center and even owned a pauper's infirmary and an orphanage. The suburb had its own town wall. An excavation in 2016 uncovered the remnants from 11th century settlements. On top of this, the search also revealed the oldest wine press in South Germany and a piece of a musical instrument which dates from the 12th century.

During the Thirty Years' War the suburb was severely affected and after the French occupation of Freiburg in 1677 Vauban removed the suburb to create space for the ring of fortresses around Freiburg which surrounded the old city very tightly. In addition to this, a fortress district was created to give the cannoneers a free field of fire.

The alsatian town of Neuf-Brisach (Neu-Breisach) which is situated 25 km west from Freiburg provides a good idea of what a model Vauban-style fortress looked like, and what the ring of fortresses in Freiburg at the time would have been like.

The French withdrew from Freiburg in 1745 and blew up its entire fortifications. The plants slowly became overgrown, entwined with the debris. The area was not repopulated until around 1825. The district was then named Ludwigsvorstadt in honour of the Grand Duke of Baden. In the 20th century, the medieval name Neuburg was used again, at least in the official identification.

During the bombardment of Freiburg in November 1944, the district was almost completely destroyed.

== Infrastructure ==
The resident population of just over 4,000 people is relatively low. Large parts of the western half of the district are occupied by the university campus, which has established its mathematics and natural sciences faculties and the rectorate in the so-called institute district. Located in the biggest part of the Herder publishing house, which used to house the press room of the publishing company, is nowadays the faculty of forestry and environmental sciences of the university. In the former paper storage people can visit the archeological collection that contains antique originals and plaster casts of antique sculptures.

The eastern part of the district houses a variety of different authorities such as the correctional institution as well as hospitals and trade schools. Two green areas are also part of the district: the City Garden and The Old Cemetery, which was the burial ground of Freiburg from 1683 to 1872. In the year 1725 and during the years 1753–57, the St. Michael Chapel was built in the cemetery. North of the cemetery the Evangelical Ludwigskirche was built after the Second World War as a replacement for the first evangelical church in Freiburg which was destroyed during the war. On the eastern edge of the cemetery is the Evangelical Lutheran Church of the Redeemer in neo-Gothic style.

The district is linked to Tramlines 2 and 4 along the Habsburger Street which are part of the public transport network of Freiburg. The bus line 27 to Herdern also goes through the district.

== Literature ==
- Hermann Flamm: Zur Topographie der Vorstadt Neuburg. In: Schau-ins-Land 41 (1914), pp. 34–36.
- Joseph Ludolph Wohleb: Zur Geschichte der Alt-Freiburger Vorstadt Neuburg. In: Alemannische Heimat 5 (1938), n. 23/24.
- Hans-Josef Wollasch: Zur Sozialgeschichte des Freiburger Stadtteils Neuburg. In: Schau-ins-Land 88 (1970), pp. 173–182.
- Walter Vetter: Freiburg. Ein Führer zu Kunst und Geschichte. Rombach, Freiburg 1986, pp. 129–133. ISBN 3-7930-0496-1
