= Bombing of Freiburg =

Bombing of Freiburg may refer to:

- Bombing of Freiburg on 10 May 1940, friendly fire by the Luftwaffe
- Operation Tigerfish, RAF raid of 27 November 1944
