= Freiburg im Breisgau Town Hall =

Town hall in Freiburg im Breisgau, Germany

- Rathaus Freiburg im Breisgau
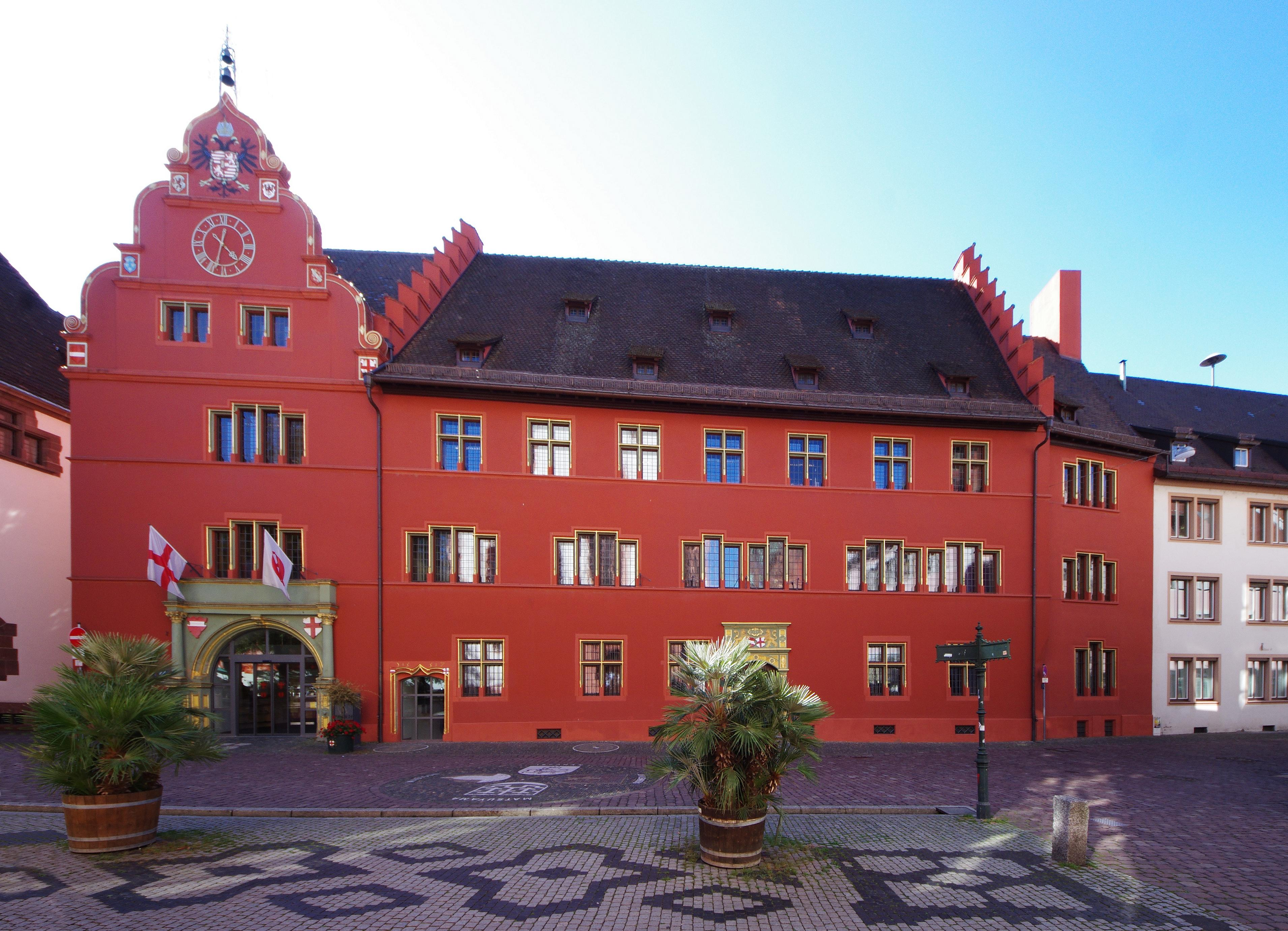
- The main frontage of the old town hall in August 2011

General information
- Type: City hall
- Architectural style: Medieval style
- Location: Freiburg im Breisgau, Germany
- Coordinates: 47.9966°N 7.8490°E
- Construction started: 1557
- Completed: 1559

The Freiburg im Breisgau Town Hall (German: Rathaus Freiburg im Breisgau) is spread over a total of 16 locations within Freiburg im Breisgau, Germany. The three most important buildings are the Old Town Hall (German: Altes Rathaus) and the New Town Hall (German: Neues Rathaus) in the city center as well as the Technical Town Hall (German: Technisches Rathaus) in the Stühlinger district. The oldest town hall in Freiburg is part of the building complex of the Old Town Hall. It is located in the inner courtyard and is now called Gerichtslaube ("court house") and is directly connected to the Old Town Hall. A passage from the New Town Hall to the Old Town Hall spans the Turmstraße between the two buildings. The three town halls form a complex, in which the three individual buildings are registered as monuments in the list of monuments of the country.

== Old Town Hall (Altes Rathaus) ==
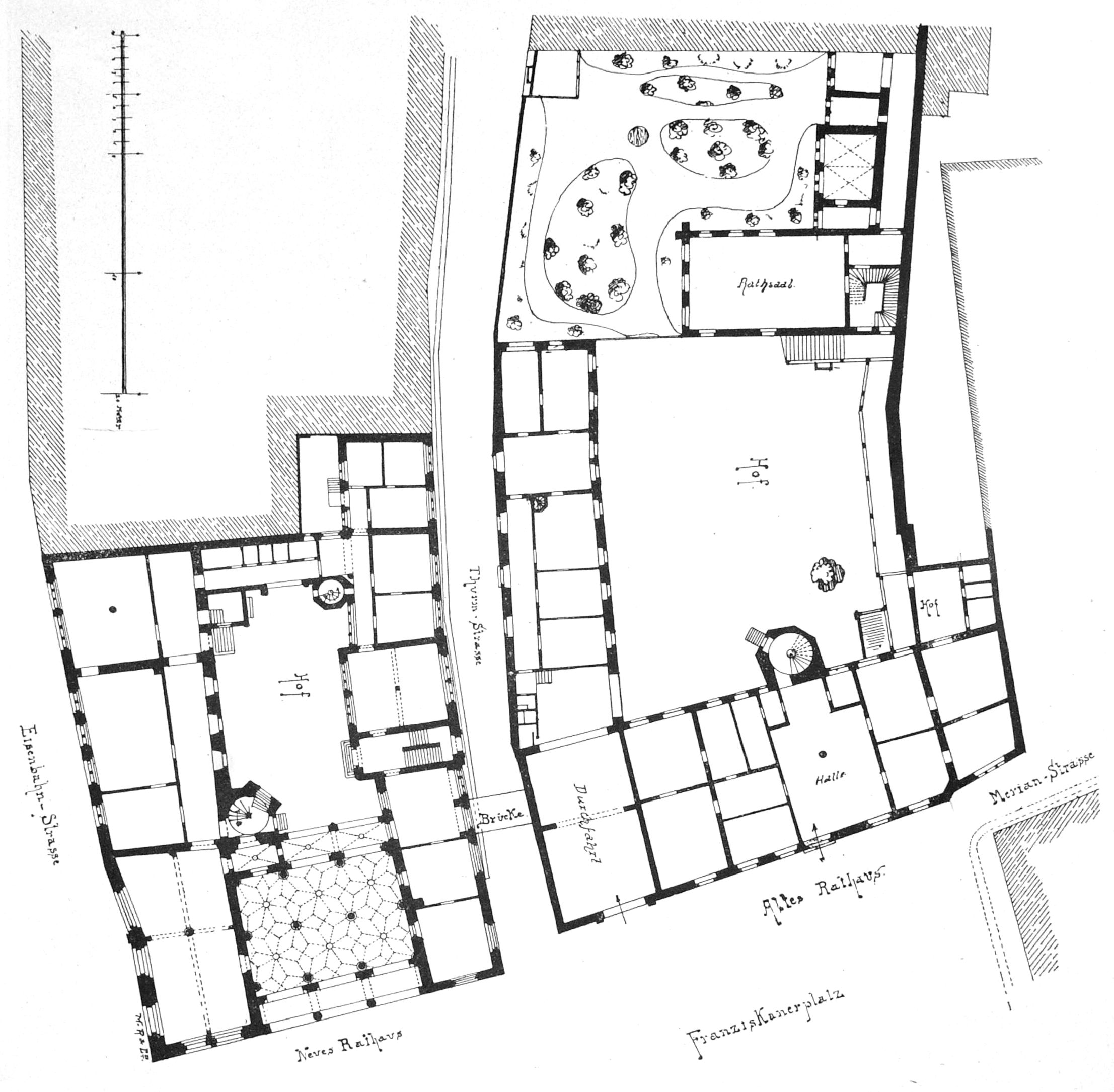
Floor plan taken from: Freiburg im Breisgau. Die Stadt und ihre Bauten

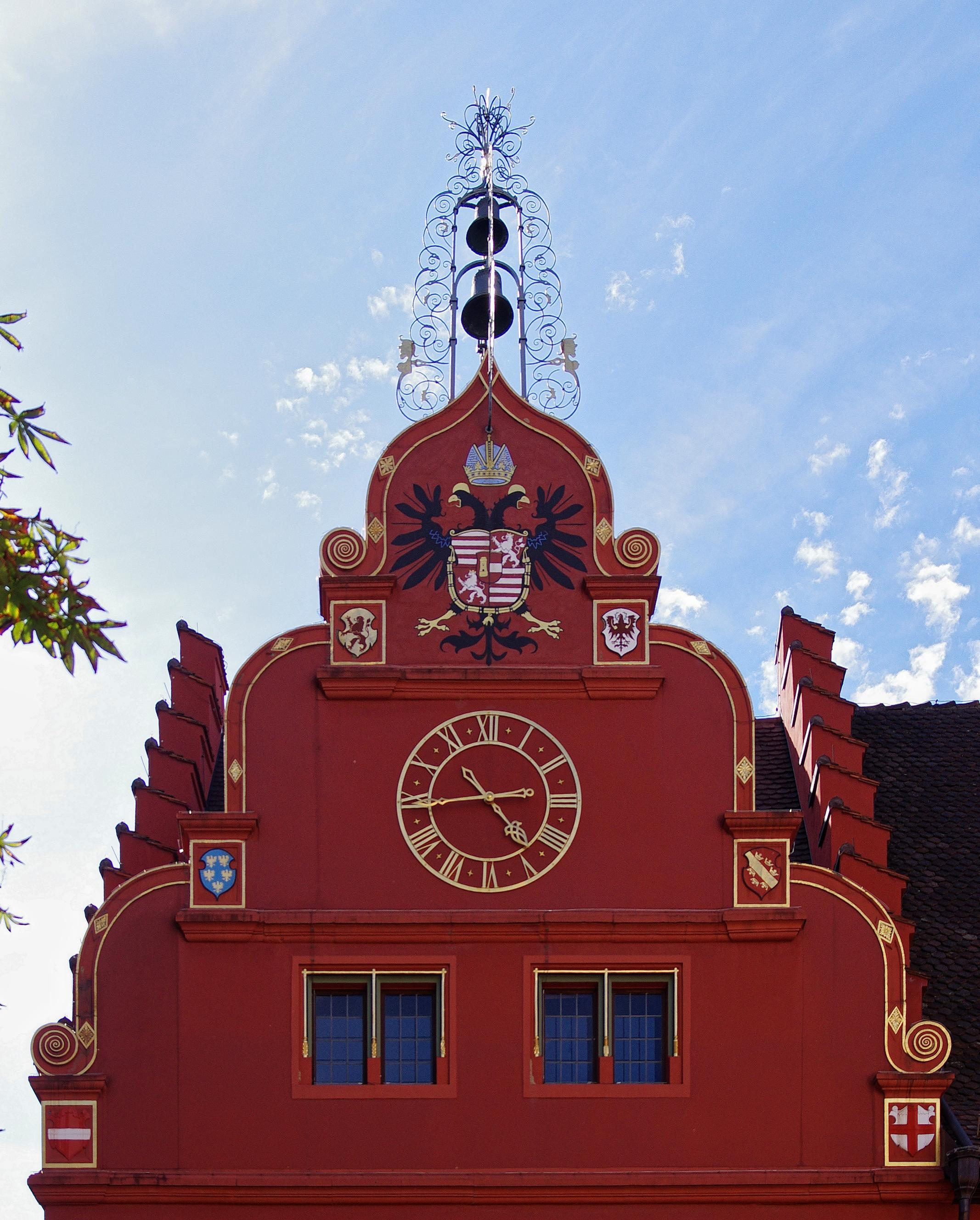
Coat of Arms on the gable

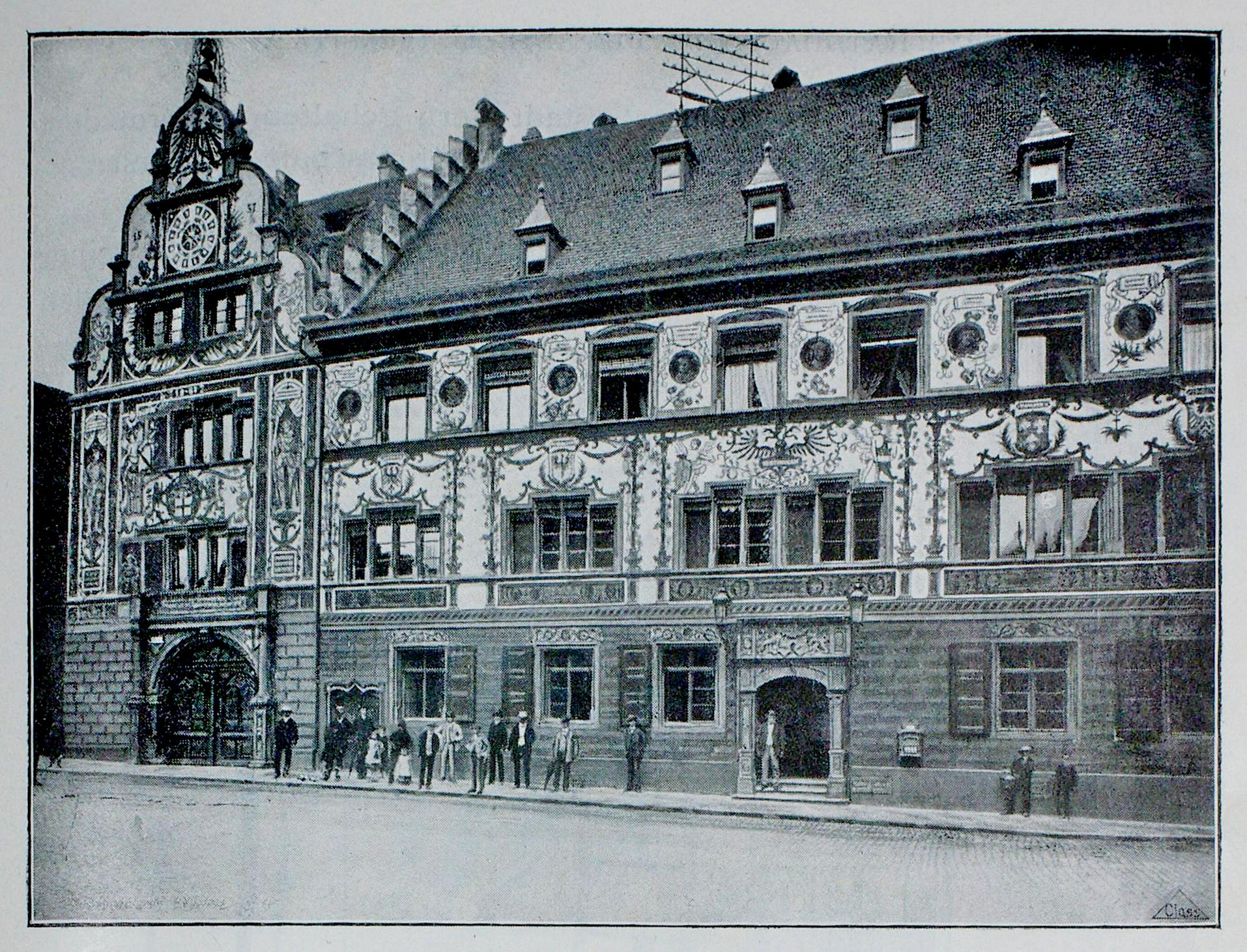
The front's painting by Fritz Geiges

At the beginning of the 14th century, the city of Freiburg bought a building on Franziskanerplatz, today Rathausplatz, followed by two more adjoining buildings to establish the chancery of the town clerk. In the court documents from the years 1443 to 1479 a Richthaus ("court house") is mentioned, which was situated in these buildings. In 1557, master builder Dietrich Neeb and master mason Barthlin Ress were assigned by the council to build a new building on the property. This new building was extended in 1561 to the north by a building, followed in 1600 by another in the Turmstraße. Even though the buildings are united by a uniform facade, it is possible to distinguish different construction phases.

The building of 1557/1559 has an asymmetrical arrangement of the construction axes, which is still visible today. The ground floor has three entrances. The main portal on the right in the Renaissance style dates back to 1558. Two lions hold the coat of arms of Freiburg and the Bindenschild of Austria. On the far left, the former passage route framed by a Renaissance arch into the courtyard of the town hall serves as the main entrance to the building. Above the arch is a clock crowned by the double-headed eagle of the Holy Roman Empire with the coats of arms of Hungary and Bohemia as well as under the Herzschild of Castile and Austria. More coats of arms on the gable over the main entrance commemorate the different monarchs in Freiburg: The space in the top right contains the red eagle of the House of Zähringen (1091–1218). Next to it there is the lion of the counts of Urach, who took over the eagle of the Zähringer as well when they were counts of Freiburg. In the middle on the left, there is the State coat of arms of the Habsburg hereditary lands, the so-called Lerchenwappen, which features five eagles on a blue background that stand for five different duchies. The Habsburgs ruled in Freiburg from 1368 to 1806 (except for 1677 until 1697, when Freiburg was part of the Kingdom of France), which is symbolized by the Alsatian coat of arms in the middle on the right. At the lower left. the shield of the House of Austria can be seen; to the right of it there is the coat of arms of Freiburg, the Saint George's Cross.

The house façade of the old town hall was painted with scenes from a dance of death in 1559. At the behest of the council, the painter Galienus Entringer had to replace his own painting with a history painting with scenes from the life of Philip II of Macedon in 1560. In 1881, Fritz Geiges replaced the neo-Gothic architectural painting of Simon Gösers of 1810 with paintings in the manner of the Renaissance, but those had to be revised in 1886 because of damage. Today, the building is plastered uniformly in sandstone red. The windows are framed in black and gold with colorful portals.

During Operation Tigerfish in 1944, part of the Second World War, the old town hall burned out completely and the entire interior decor was lost. Modern materials were used in the reconstruction of the building. The Old Town Hall was also extended by three wings in the plain functional style usual for that time. As a result of the new construction, only the nuns' undercroft of the convent of Poor Clares was preserved. This convent was housed in the former Regelhaus (a quasi-monastic building) Zum Lämmlein from 1672 until its abolition in 1782. After that, the buildings were used by the "Hospital of the Holy Spirit".

== New Town Hall (Neues Rathaus) ==
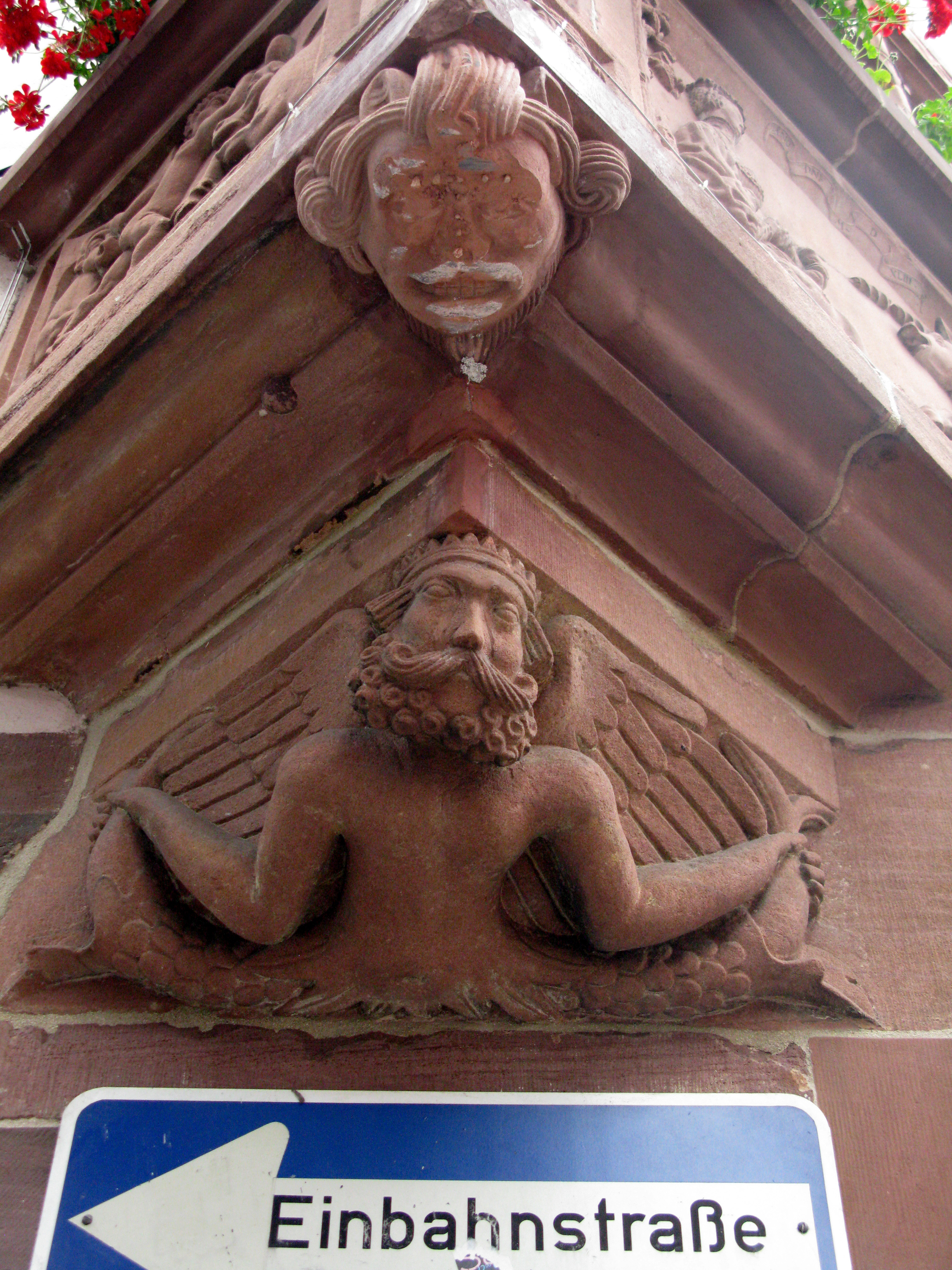
Damaged figure (top)

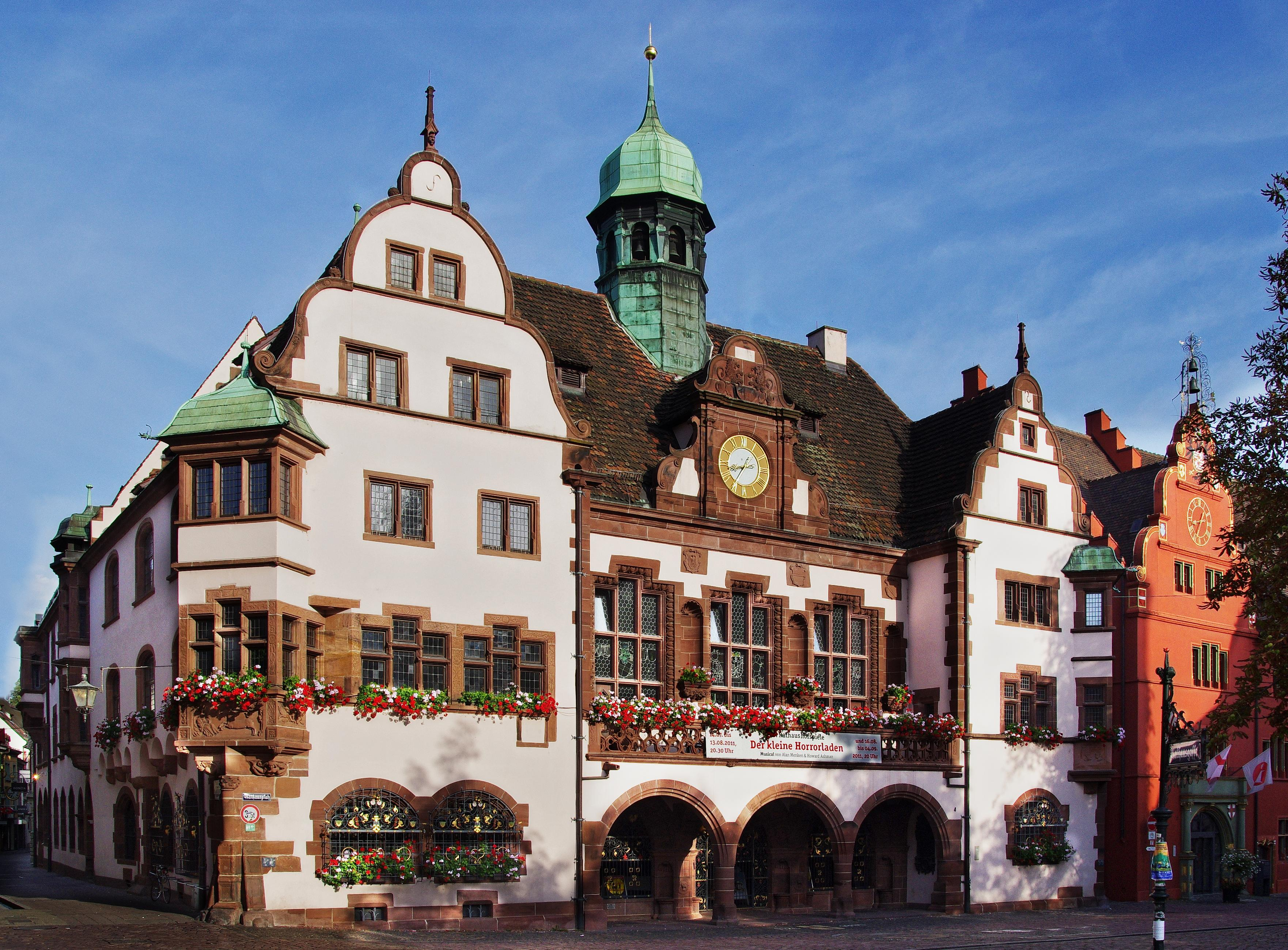
New Town Hall

The origins of the New Town Hall can be traced back to a duplex house. The one on the right (Zum Rechen) was commissioned by the physician Joachim Schiller von Herdern and built between 1539 and 1545. The university bought the adjacent house (Zum Phönix) and turned both houses into a complex of buildings.

As assembly between the buildings a prestigious columned doorway decorated with pediments carrying the inscription Academia friburgensis had been chosen. This complex of buildings has served the university until 1774 as Collegium Universititas. After the abolition of the Jesuit order, the university received new collegiate buildings in the Bertoldstraße. The administration department and three of four faculties (medicine not included) relocated there. Since then, the building was called Alte Universität ("Old University"), Altes Kollegium ("Old College") or Alte Anatomie ("Old Anatomy"). In 1867, the Faculty of Medicine moved to new buildings northwards where a new university quarter arose. In the early 18th century, the Auditorium maximum (the biggest lecture hall) had been created in the course of a renovation of the building's south wing. Due to its grand stucco ceiling, the auditorium is considered the most beautiful room in Freiburg from the baroque period. In 1779, another auditorium for anatomical lectures (Theatrum Anatomicum) was created in the northern part of the building.

After more than 300 years belonging to the university, the town purchased the building for 140 gold mark and finished its conversion into the New Town Hall in 1901. Reasons for this include lack of space and the historic preservation of a monument. In addition to that, the town wanted to prevent the demolition of the building and therefore real estate speculation. The transformation into the town hall was also linked to many changes to the substance of the building. A bay-window figure was frequently damaged by trucks and has been fully replaced in 2012.

== Gerichtslaube ==
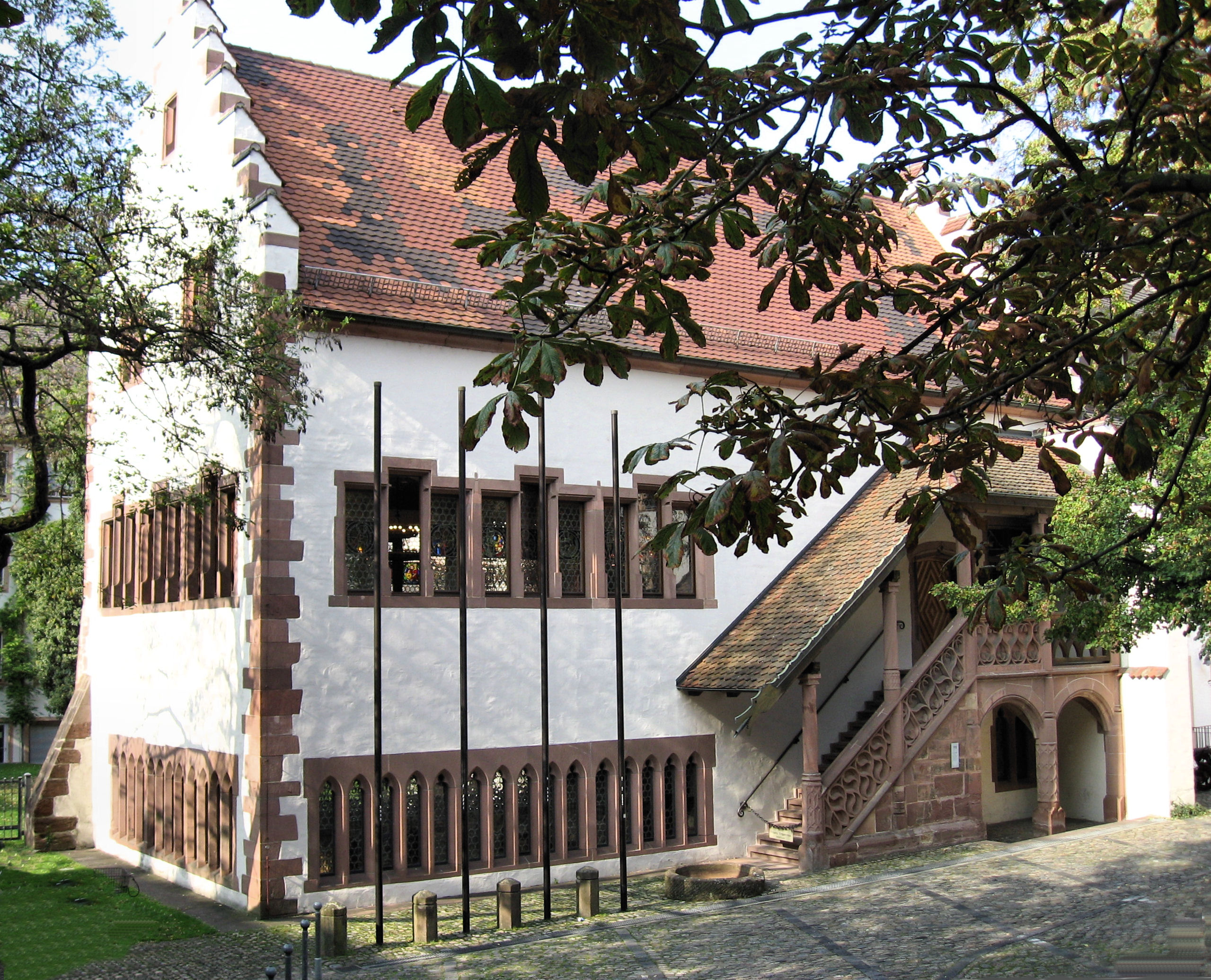
The Gerichtslaube (court house)

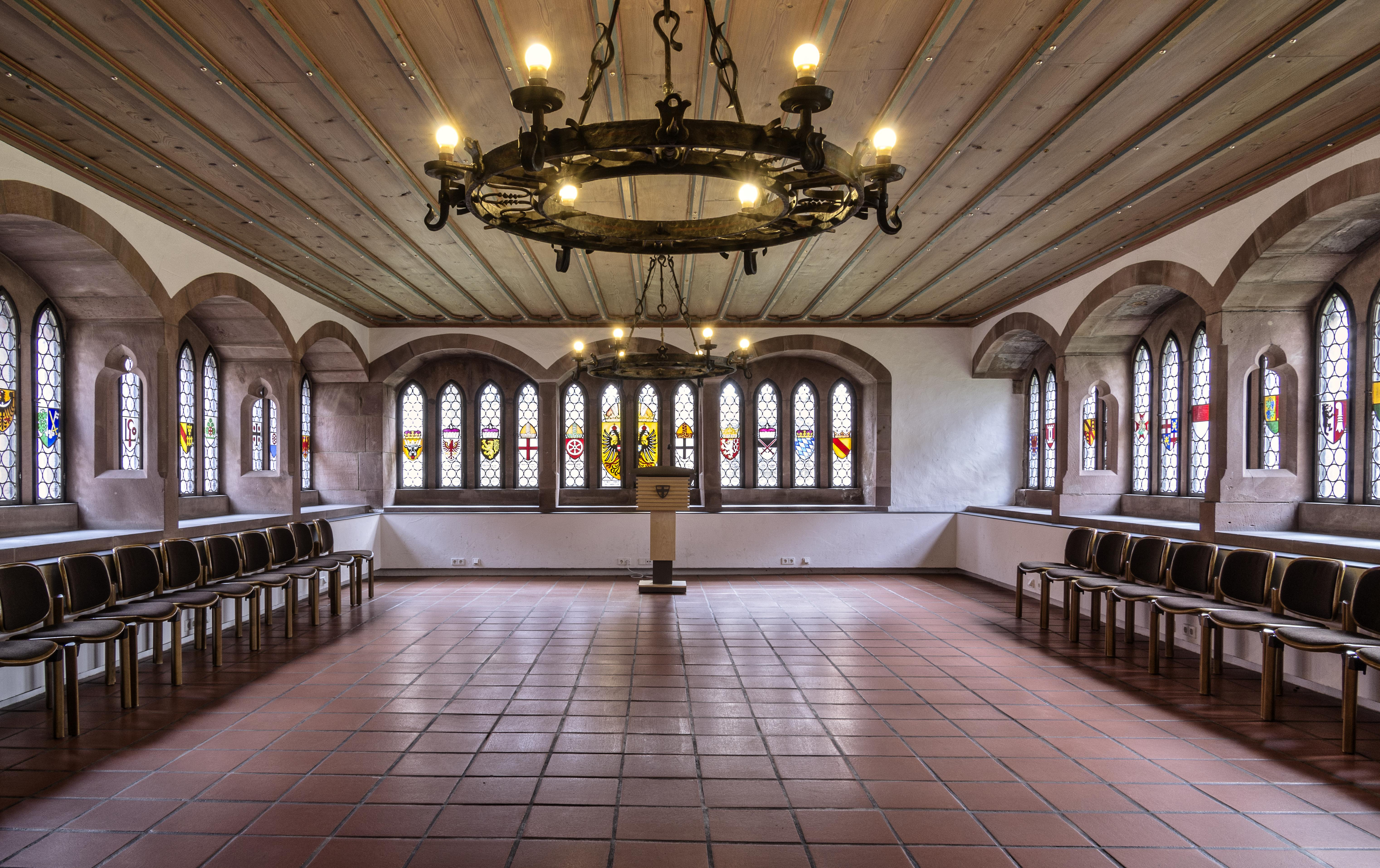
Lower hall

The Gerichtslaube ("court house") is the oldest town hall in Freiburg. It is first documented in 1328 as a council building, but only since the 16th century identified as Gerichtslaube.

The Gerichtslaube was destroyed in the air raid on Freiburg (Operation Tigerfish) of 1944 almost to the foundations; only parts of the access staircase and the west wall, the annex which contained the archives, including the establishment of 1553, remained almost intact. From 1961, the reconstruction was run by the Kuratorium Gerichtslaube, a civic initiative, and in March 1975, the reconstruction was started according to the plans of the architect Gregor Schroeder. After the topping out ceremony in December 1975, it was solemnly inaugurated in June 1979.

== Literature ==
- Rudolf Thoma: Das alte Rathhaus und die Universität. In: Badischer Architecten- und Ingenieur-Verein, Oberrheinischer Bezirk (ed.): Freiburg im Breisgau. Die Stadt und ihre Bauten. H. M. Poppen & Sohn, Freiburg im Breisgau 1898, p. 449–466
- Berent Schwineköper: Gerichtslaube und Rathaus zu Freiburg. Eine quellenkritische Untersuchung zu Grundfragen der Freiburger Topographie. In: Schau-ins-Land 83, 1965, p. 5–69 (Digitalisat).
- Peter Kalchthaler: Die historischen Rathäuser. Press office, Freiburg im Breisgau 1990.
