= Wiwilíbrücke =

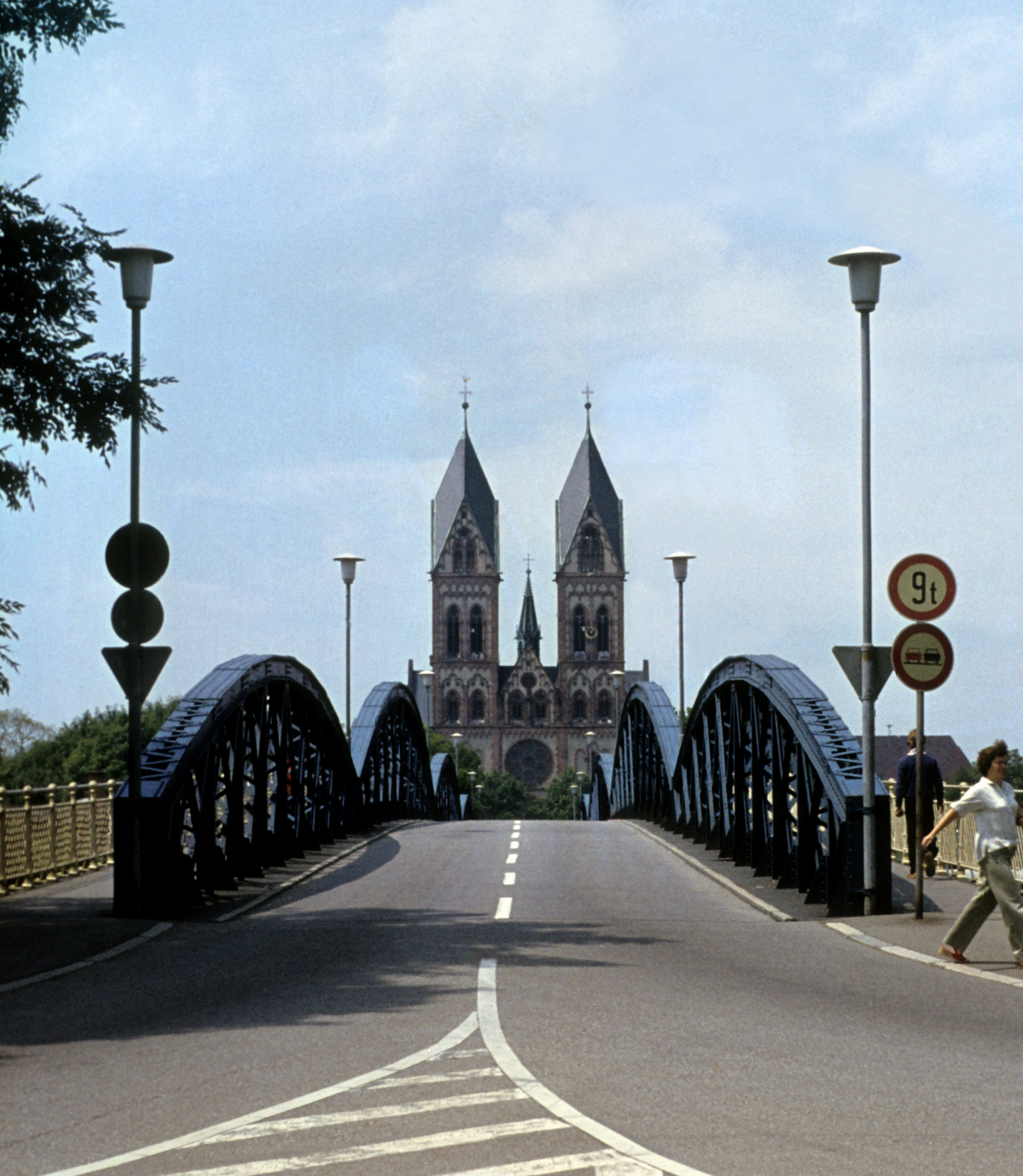
- Wiwilíbrücke in 1980 while still open for cars
- Coordinates: 47°59′45.77″N 7°50′23.6″E
- Carries: Bicycles, pedestrians
- Locale: Freiburg im Breisgau, Germany
- Official name: Wiwilíbrücke

Characteristics
- Design: Truss Bridge
- Material: Iron
- Total length: 161.8 m (530.8 ft)
- Width: 10.3 m (33.8 ft)

History
- Engineering design by: Max Meckel
- Construction start: 1885
- Construction end: 1886

Location
- Interactive map of Wiwilíbrücke

Wiwilíbrücke (engl. Wiwilí Bridge) is a bridge of the German city Freiburg im Breisgau which is also called Blaue Brücke (engl. Blue Bridge) because of its paint and it had formerly been called Stühlingerbücke before the new Stühlingerbücke was built for the tramway. The bridge connects the city's district Stühlinger to the old town as it links the church square of Herz-Jesu-Kirche to Konrad-Adenauer-Platz in spanning the railway tracks of Freiburg Hauptbahnhof. Today, Wiwilíbrücke is a listed building and is used by up to 10,000 cyclists per day.

== History ==
The bridge was built in 1885–86 in place of an inaccessible crossing of the same height by the Grand Duchy of Baden State Railway. It was designed by Max Meckel who had designed the Herz-Jesu church shortly before, located in the axis of the bridge. The construction was carried out by the Eisenwerk in Kaiserslautern, an industrial company that was active in iron and steel construction. The bridge was inaugurated as "Kaiser-Wilhelm-Brücke", however, the name didn't stick among the residents, who called it "Stühlingerbrücke". It crosses the station tracks and access roads on five -due to the railway tracks- uneven---. The cost of the Eisenwerk was of 151,412 German gold mark; the cost of the entire construction around 428,000 gold marks.

From 1909 to the end of 1961, the line 5 (Herdern (Freiburg) - Haslach (Freiburg)) led the Trams in Freiburg im Breisgau across the bridge. With the Railway Crossing Act, the bridge became the property of the city of Freiburg in 1978, after the track had already been removed in 1972 as part of a first refurbishment and a new concrete carriageway had been applied, to secure the usage for the next 15 years.

As part of the redesign of the station area and a related construction of the abutment on the east side in 1996, the bridge was then closed to motor traffic and was made accessible only for bicycles and pedestrians. Next to the abutment on the Stühlinger side, the "mobile" bike-and-mobility station was built with a bicycle parking garage in 1999, called bicycle station since 2014. In 2013, the bridge was named after Freiburgs sister city Wiwilí de Jinotega.

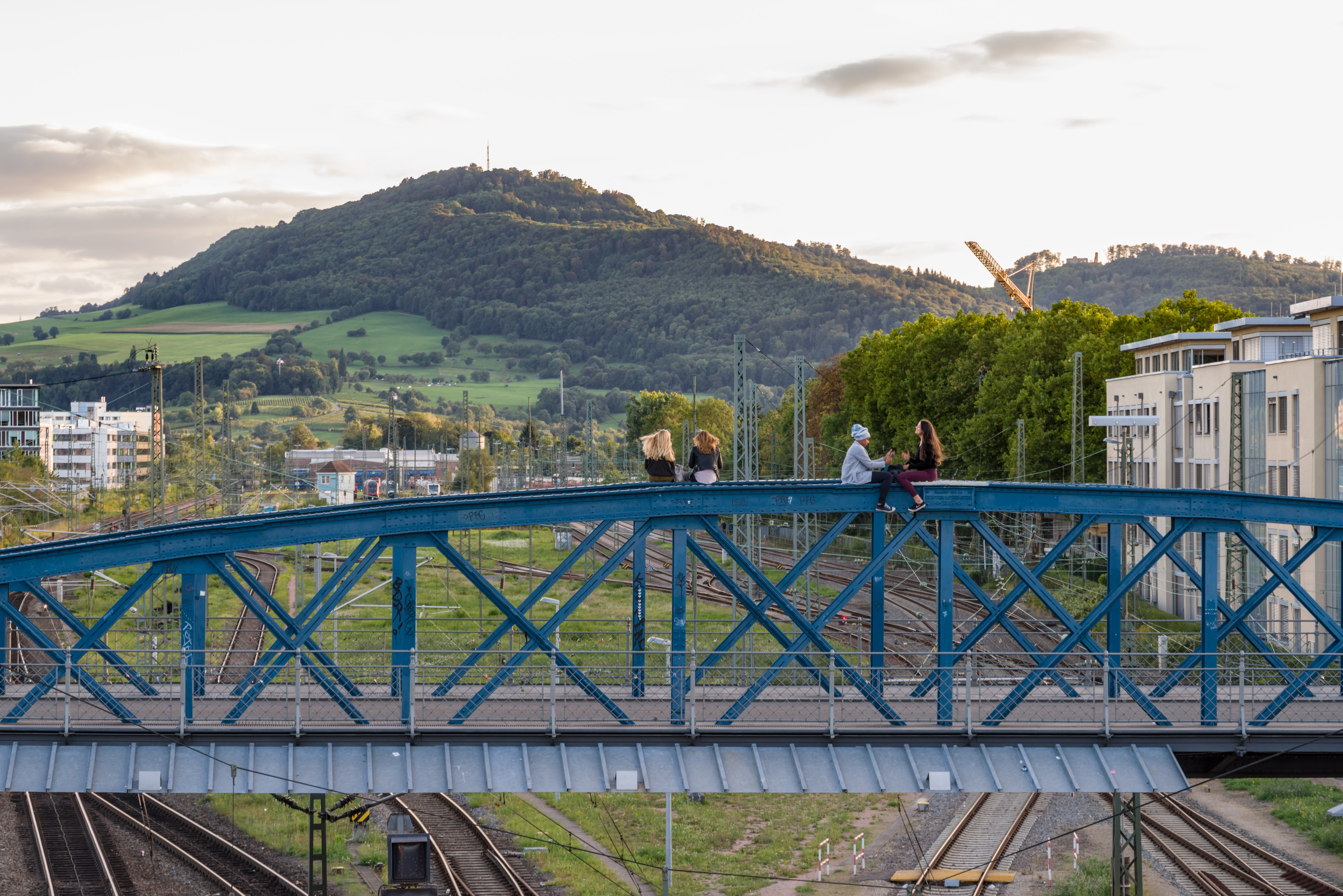
Wiwilíbrücke as meeting point with vief of the Schönberg.

In March 2008, fundamental renovation work was started for which the bridge was successively raised by 1.50 m (4.9 ft) in five sections in order to enable work above the railway tracks. In addition to replacing many static steel parts and the road pavement, drainage channels to protect Wiwilíbrücke from corrosion were installed at the edges of the roadway and in the edge area of the sidewalks. Shortly after work had started, a massive asbestos pollution was discovered which had to be removed.

The bridge piers were raised by about 50 cm to increase the safety profile for the railway. As a result, the inclination of the bridge's entry and exit ramps was increased by half a percent. The work was originally scheduled to take nine months and to cost around 2.5 million euros. However, due to the doubling of steel consumption and additional asbestos problems, the work lasted until September 2009 and cost 6.3 million euros. A spiral staircase leading from the northern sidewalk to the bus station was not restored after renovation.

The Freiburg Marathon crosses the bridge again after the renovation. On warm days, the arches of Wiwilíbrücke are partly used to sit and the bridge serves as a location for tango dances from time to time.

Since its restoration the bridge is only allowed to be gritted without the use of road salt to prevent corrosion.

== Technical data ==
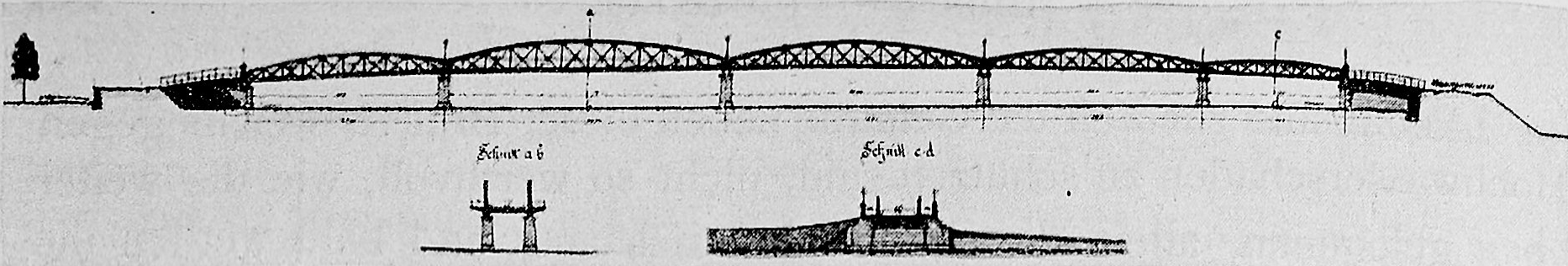
Profile

The total length of the bridge from one abutment to the other was 161.8 m (530.8 ft) when it was first opened while the width of the road was 5.2 m (17.1 ft). The sidewalks were 1.7 m (5.5 ft) wide each. The access roads on either side had to be built with a slope of 4% because of the location of the connected streets. The maximum height of the individual arches varies between 2.79 m (9.15 ft) and 4.13 m (13.52 ft). The total mass of the ironwork was 540.4 metric tons (595.6 imperial tons) but it increased to about 1720 metric tons (≈1900 imperial tons), including supporting structure and concrete panels.

The entire bridge as seen from the perspective of the new Stühlingerbrücke

== Memorial places ==
There are two memorials located on the bridge. One is a coat with a bronzen Star of David that seemingly was forgotten in a great hurry. It reminds of the deportation of Jews in 1940 as part of the Wagner-Bürckel campaign. The coat was created by Birgit Stauch, an artist from Baden-Baden. It was placed on the bridge by Johannes Rühl, second in charge of the culture department of Freiburg in 2003.

Apart from this there are also plaques that remind of Bernd Koberstein, a communist and trade unionist from Freiburg as well as Albrecht "Tonio" Pflaum, a doctor from Freiburg. Both of them were murdered during a humanitarian aid action in Wiwilí by the Nicaraguan Contras.

== Literature ==
- Eberhard Hübsch: Die Staatseisenbahnen. In: Badischer Architekten- und Ingenieur- Verband: Freiburg im Breisgau. Die Stadt und ihre Bauten. H. M. Poppen & Sohn, Freiburg im Breisgau 1898.
