= Muhammad Saleh al-Aulaqi =

Yemeni politician and diplomat (born 1940)

Muhammad Saleh al-Aulaqi (1940 – 30 April 1973) was a Yemeni politician and diplomat. Aulaqi was the minister of foreign affairs of South Yemen and advocated for the unification of Yemen. On 30 April 1973, a South Yemen Air Force transport aircraft carrying diplomats on a tour of South Yemen crashed, killing all 25 people on board, including himself, writer Mohammad Abdul-Wali, and several ambassadors. It was likely a Douglas DC-3.
