= Mohammad Abdul-Wali =

- Born: November 12, 1939; Debre Birhan, Ethiopia
- Died: April 30, 1973 (aged 33); Yemen
- Occupations: Novelist; Diplomat
- Writing career
- Notable works: They Die Strangers (1971); Sanaa: An Open City (1977)

Mohammad Abdul-Wali (November 12, 1939 – April 30, 1973) was a Yemeni diplomat and a prominent writer of Yemeni-Ethiopian descent.

== Life and career ==
Abdul-Wali was born in Debre Birhan, Ethiopia. His mother was Ethiopian and his father, who was probably a shopkeeper, was originally from Yemen's Al-Hujariah region. His father was politically active and opposed Yemen's monarchy, and was forced to flee - first to Aden, and then to Addis Ababa.

As a child, Mohammad Abdul-Wali attended the Yemeni Community School in Addis Ababa. In 1954, his father sent him to study at an Islamic studies institute in Aden; this was the first time Abdul-Wali had been to Yemen for any significant period of time (he had briefly visited when he was six years old).

In 1955, Abdul-Wali began his studies at the University of Cairo, where he became interested in Marxism. He was expelled from Egypt in 1959 for allegedly being a Communist, and after a brief period in Yemen he moved to Moscow, where he learnt Russian and studied literature at the Gorky Institute.

After finishing his studies in 1962, Abdul-Wali returned to North Yemen, where a revolution had just taken place against the monarchy. He was enrolled in the young country's diplomatic corps and became chargé d'affaires first in Moscow and later in Berlin, but in 1967 he was expelled from the country for allegedly spying. He was imprisoned for a year in 1968. He later served briefly as head of Yemen Airlines and Director General of Aviation, but fell out of favor with the government and was imprisoned again in 1972, for eight months. This second stint in prison was allegedly due to two short stories he wrote, as part of his collection "Our Uncle Saleh" (Arabic: عمنا صالح العمراني). After resigning from the government, he founded a publishing house in Taizz. He died on April 30, 1973 in a never thoroughly investigated airplane crash on his way from Aden to Hadramaut in South Yemen, along with South Yemeni foreign minister Muhammad Saleh al-Aulaqi and a group of other ambassadors. It was likely a Douglas DC-3.

Abdul-Wali was married twice: first to his cousin, when he was 14 years old; and later to a Swedish woman, after the death of his first wife.

== Legacy and works ==
Abdul-Wali is considered one of the forerunners of the modern Yemeni literary movement, described by fellow Yemeni writer Abdulaziz Al-Maqaleh as "Yemen's Chekhov." He is regarded as one of the first Yemeni writers motivated by artistic purposes rather than nationalist agendas.

He published three collections of short stories: al-Ard, ya Salma ("Our Land, Salma", 1966), Shay’ ismuhu al-hanin ("Something Called Love", 1972) and ’Ammuna Salih ("Uncle Salih", 1978); as well as two novellas: Yamutun ghuraba’ ("They Die Strangers", 1971) and Sana'a: madeena maftuha (Sana'a: An Open City, 1977). His collected works were posthumously published in 1987. An English-language translation of 14 of his stories, They Die Strangers: A Novella and Stories from Yemen, was published in 2001 by the Center for Middle Eastern Studies at the University of Texas-Austin.

Given Abdul-Wali's Ethiopian heritage, many of his works dealt with immigrants to Yemen and the fate of Yemeni-African marriages. His novella They Die Strangers, for example, is about a Yemeni national who opens a small shop in Addis Ababa but has a long-standing desire to return home. Similarly, his short story "Abu Rupee" describes a boy living in Ethiopia with a Yemen-born father, and who has never seen the country. Several of his stories are also set in Yemen's Al-Hujariah region, where his father was from.

== Books ==
- Our Land, Salma (الأرض يا سلمى) (1966), short story collection
- They Die Strangers (يموتون غرباء) (1971), novel
- Something Called Love (شيء اسمه الحنين) (1972), short story collection
- Sana'a: An Open City (صنعاء.. مدينة مفتوحة) (1977), novel
- Uncle Salih (عمنا صالح العمراني) (1978), short story collection
