= Open city =

City declared to be undefended in war

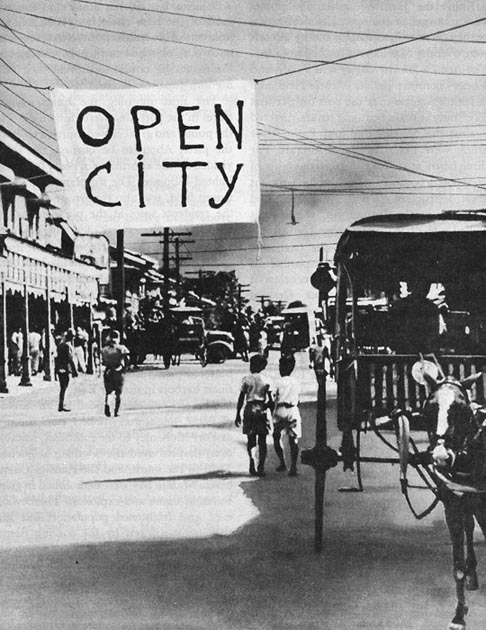
Manila was declared an open city in December 1941 to avoid its destruction as Imperial Japan invaded the Commonwealth of the Philippines

In war, an open city is a settlement which has announced it has abandoned all defensive efforts, generally in the event of the imminent capture of the city to avoid destruction. Once a city has declared itself open, the opposing military will be expected under international law to peacefully occupy the city rather than destroy it.

Protocol I of the Geneva Conventions forbids the attacking party to "attack, by any means whatsoever, non-defended localities". The intent is to protect the city's civilians and cultural landmarks from a battle which may be futile.

Attacking forces do not always respect the declaration of an open city. Defensive forces will occasionally use the designation as a political tactic as well. In some cases, the declaration of a city to be open is made by a side on the verge of surrender and defeat; in other cases, those making such a declaration are willing and able to fight on, but prefer that the specific city be spared. Often, resistance movements will be active in open cities, straining the temperate conduct of the occupying forces.

== Examples ==
=== 19th century ===
During the 1814 Battle of Paris near the end of the Napoleonic Wars, Paris was in effect treated in a way that modern language would call an "open city". After very stiff fighting in the suburbs of the French capital on 30 March 1814, the defenders agreed to abandon Paris to prevent taking the fight to the city itself and bringing its destruction. The combined forces of Russia, Austria, Prussia, and Württemberg occupied it the next day.

=== World War II ===
Numerous cities were declared open cities during World War II:

- Kraków was left undefended (except for some small local units) after the Polish 6th Infantry Division marched by the city to the nearby Niepołomice Forest to set new defensive lines during the German invasion of Poland. This led the Mayor of Kraków to declare it an open city on 5 September 1939. The German Army entered the city the next day.
- Brussels was declared an open city by the Belgian government on 17 May 1940 during the Battle of Belgium, and was occupied by the Germans.
- Paris was declared an open city by the French government on 11 June 1940 during the Battle of France, as the government moved to Bordeaux.
- Belgrade was declared open on 5 April 1941 by the Kingdom of Yugoslavia, just before the German invasion of Yugoslavia. The Wehrmacht did not respect the open city status and heavily bombed the city.
- Manila was declared an open city on 26 December 1941 by US general Douglas MacArthur during the Japanese invasion of the Philippines. However, the United States Armed Forces were still using the city for logistical purposes. The Imperial Japanese Army therefore ignored the declaration and bombed the city.
- Batavia (now Jakarta) was declared an open city on 5 March 1942 after the remaining units of the Royal Netherlands East Indies Army were evacuated. The Japanese occupied the city the next day.
- Rome was declared open on 14 August 1943 by the Italian government following the cessation of Allied bombing. Subsequently, Allied forces entered Rome in June 1944 and retreating German forces also declared Florence and Chieti on 24 March 1944 open cities.
- Athens was declared an open city by the Germans on 11 October 1944.
- Hamburg was declared open on 3 May 1945 by the Germans and was immediately occupied by the British Army.

=== Post-World War II Japan ===
In 1977, a far-left group in Japan—called the "National Open City Declaration Movement Network"—began organizing activists to make cities preemptively declare themselves "defenseless" under the Geneva Convention, so that in the event of war, they would be legally forced to welcome any invasion. This was rejected by nearly all of Japan's political parties and the ruling government as inherently absurd, since Japan was not in a war, and in the event of war such a decision would have to be approved by the national government. However, the Social Democratic Party—which was the junior party of the ruling coalition from 1994 to 1996—supported it.

Nevertheless, four wards of Tokyo and Kagoshima City, Japan's southernmost port, among many other cities considered legislation to be declared "open cities".

=== Afghanistan ===
Segundo Eclar Romero of the Philippine Daily Inquirer argues that Kabul, the capital of Afghanistan, was declared a de facto open city by President Ashraf Ghani when he fled the country amidst the collapse of the Islamic Republic during the 2021 Taliban offensive, allowing it to fall unopposed and ending the war. While acknowledging the lack of bloodshed, he argues the move hastened the downfall of the republic and stymied the materialization of an impactful anti-Taliban resistance movement.

== See also ==
- Laws of war
- Rome, Open City (Roma città aperta), an Italian film (1945) about Rome's days as an open city.
- Sana'a: An Open City, a Yemeni novel that narrates the sack of Sana'a in 1948.
