= Sana'a: An Open City =

Novel by Mohammad Abdul-Wali

Sana'a: An Open City (صنعاء مدينة مفتوحة) is a short novel by Yemeni author Mohammad Abdul-Wali. It was included in the Arab Writers Union list of the 105 best Arabic novels of the 20th century. It was published posthumously in 1977; Abdul-Wali had died in an airplane crash four years earlier.

The book's title refers to the sack of Sana'a, Yemen's capital, following the 1948 assassination of Imam Yahya, part of a coup attempt. His son Ahmad, then the crown prince, secured support from tribal groups to take power; in exchange, he permitted them to sack Sana'a (declaring it "an open city", or permissible to loot), as well as other Yemeni cities.

The novel caused controversy in 2000, decades after its publication, when the Arab Writers Union included it on their list of the best Arabic novels of the 20th century. Passages in the book suggesting that God is unjust prompted some Islamists to declare the author an apostate. The editor-in-chief of al-Thaqafiyah, Samir al-Yusufi, was prosecuted and imprisoned for republishing the novel, and was reportedly harassed by members of the Islamist Islah party. However, the case was later dropped and al-Yusufi freed.

== Plot ==
The narrator and protagonist, Nu'man, is a young married man who lives in Aden and is alienated from his family and home village. The novel is epistolary, with Nu'man telling stories in letters he writes to an unnamed Yemeni friend of his who is studying in France.

In the first section of the book, Nu'man reluctantly spends several months in his home village with his family and wife. He despises small-town life, the conservatism of the villagers, their gossip and superstitious beliefs. He no longer loves his wife, though cannot explain why. He starts an affair with a woman he describes as a "brown-skinned mountain girl" whose husband is working abroad. However, she and many others are killed when heavy rains cause landslides and flash floods. As he is about to return to Aden, his wife informs him that she is pregnant.

Nu'man then relays stories he is told by two of his friends in Aden. One of them, a man from Sana'a whom Nu'man had previously regarded as aloof and mysterious, tells him his life story and why he left Sana'a. The man's wife and daughter were killed during the sack of Sana'a in 1948, and he emigrated to Aden and began drinking heavily. The other friend, a sailor, described a journey he took as an adolescent to the town of Zabid, where he hoped to study Islam. However, he discovered that the town had become a backwater. He learned how to recite the Qur'an there, and his mellifluous voice and recitations brought him to the attention of the town's governor. He later became a sailor and moved to Aden.

One day, Nu'man receives a letter informing him that his wife died in childbirth, as well as the baby. He becomes depressed and takes up with a teenage prostitute named Zainab. Meanwhile, the factory where Nu'man's friends worked closes, throwing them all into unemployment, except for the sailor. Nu'man, driven mad with grief for his late wife and regret for how he treated her, becomes delirious and imagines that he has died. The novel ends with Nu'man traveling to Sana'a with his friend.
