= Freiburg Stühlinger =

Coordinates: 48.0011°N 7.8381°E

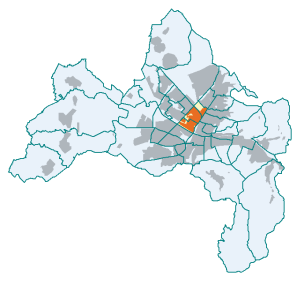
Freiburg Stühlinger

Stühlinger (German pronunciation: [ˈʃtyːlɪŋɐ]) is a district to the west of the historic city center of Freiburg im Breisgau. In December 2013, 18,300 residents lived in the neighborhood. There are three boroughs: Stühlinger-Beurbarung, Stühlinger-Eschholz and Alt-Stühlinger. Although historically correct, the railroad Freiburg-Colmar is the north end of the Stühlinger and therefore Stühlinger-Beurbarung is not part of the district anymore. The district borders the area of the central train station of the Deutsche Bahn AG to the east, the river Dreisam to the south, tracks of the railroad freight transportation to the west and the district Brühl to the north.

== History ==
Today's area of Stühlinger was previously a marsh and meadow terrain. Farmers from Betzenhausen used the "Mittelheuweg" to get to the Münster market to sell their goods. This path corresponded roughly with the modern tracks of the tram. The Lords of Stühlingen owed part of the land used for agriculture.

Two main parts were important for the development of the Stühlinger district: for one the demographic growth in the second half of the 19th century, and second the new Baden main line between Offenburg and Basel in 1845, with a stop in Freiburg. The transportation of cargo benefited from this newly built train station. The end and recovery from the Franco-Prussian War and the foundation of the German Reich in 1871 pushed the development further.

As a result, the city of Freiburg designated three streets parallel to the tracks of the railroad and five crossroads as a new building site named "Hinterm Bahnhof" ("Behind the train station"). The district was not called Stühlinger until 1886. Field names were also "Escholz" and "Stühlinger", named after the Lords of Stühlingen.

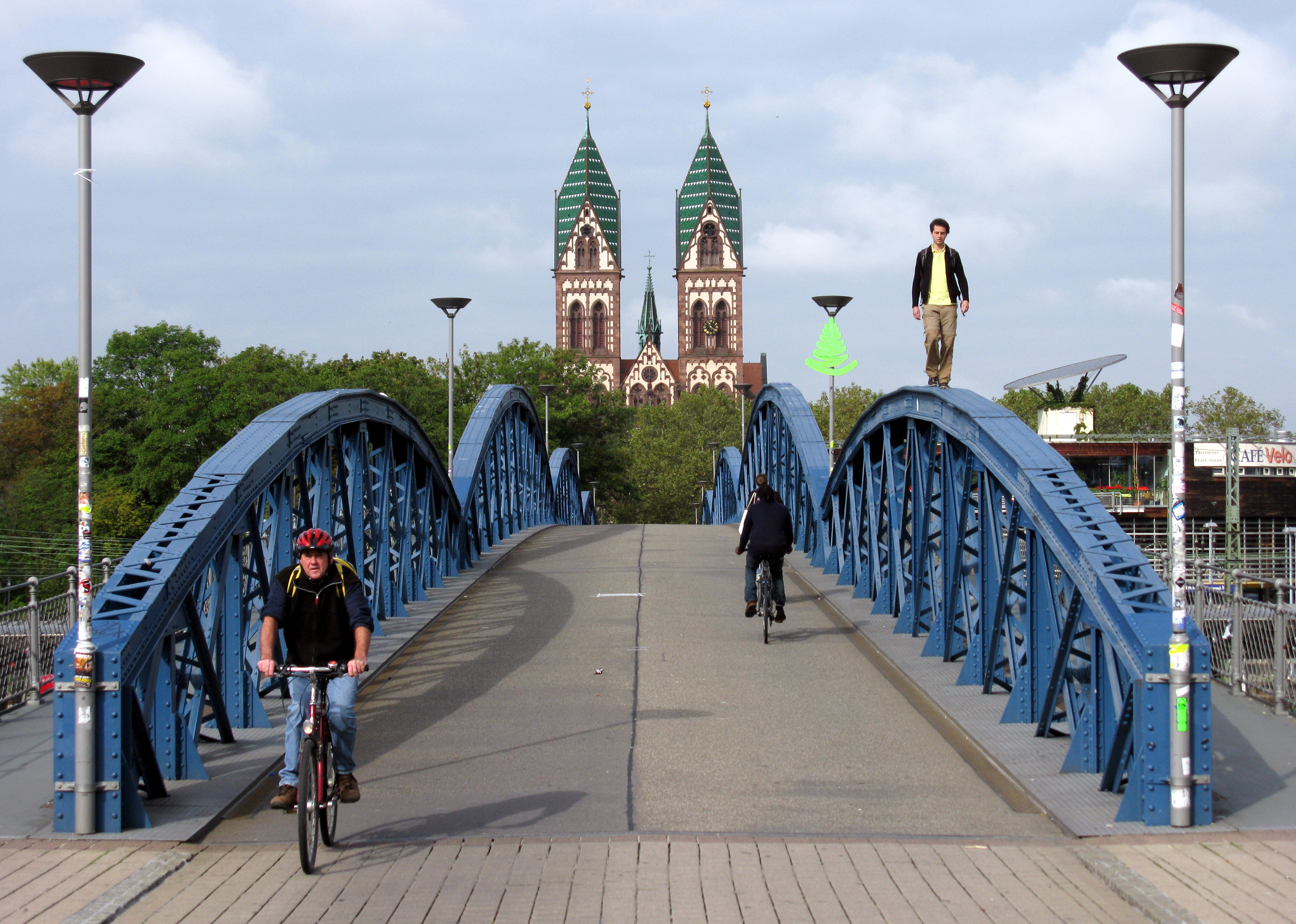
Wiwili bridge

Beginning in 1875, the area behind the train station had been developed. A pedestrian subway at the train station and a bridge ending at the church square in Stühlinger were and still are the connections to the city center. The bridge Wiwilíbrücke was originally named "Stühlinger Brücke" but is now named after the sister town Wiwilí in Nicaragua. It is also known as the Blue bridge because of its blue paint coat. The church "Herz-Jesu-Kirch" ("Sacred Heart Church") was built in the style of the Limburg Cathedral and became the visible center of the district. Behind the church two school buildings were developed: One for boys and one for girls.

Besides residential development companies and public utility installations located in the new district. For example, a gas work, which was located in the Wiehere before moved to the south of Stühlinger and a new power station was built. Close by the building company of Brenzinger & Cie. and a brewery of Louis Sinner were built as well as a pump company named "Lederle". Other companies were: a lock company (Theodor Kromer), a tinder company (Klingele), a pipe organ and orchestrion company (M. Welte & Söhne), a company for lifting equipment (Gebrüder Birmelin), and other smaller businesses.

The new main cemetery of the city was built in 1872 and starting in 1926 new buildings of the university medical center were built close by. The in 1916 completed new bold Lutheran church was completely destroyed after the Second World War and was rebuilt modestly on the 1950s. A mental hospital was added in 1877 which was controversial if it would damage the image of the district. A year after the bombardment on November 27, 1944 a light railway was installed to transport the rubber of the destroyed buildings to the former gravel quarry "Flückiger". Today it is assumed that the remains of Phosphor in the bombs are the reason for the high amount of Phosphor in the Flückigersee which has arisen there.

After the end of the Second World War the development of the Stühlinger towards the west continued. For example, another Catholic church (St. Josef) and a Protestant church (Church of the Holy Cross) were built as well as a vocational school. Building authorities and the employment agency established their locations here, and a clinic concerned with tumors and more dormitories for students were set up.

== Facilities ==
=== Education ===
There are many preschools located in the borough.

As far as elementary education the "Hebelschule" is an elementary school as well as a school for lower secondary education (Hauptschule).

The "Hansjakobschule" is a secondary school/middle school (Realschule). Both schools are located next to the Sacred-Heart Church and were once built being single-gender schools.

There are more secondary schools such as the vocational school, which houses different departments for various careers.

The "Max-Weber-Schule" offers a lot of options regarding careers in the economy. A school of the University Medical Center trains future nurses.

=== Culture ===
There are some coffee shops, bars, restaurants, alternative shops, handicraft businesses and some shopping opportunities.

=== Authorities ===
Some authorities mentioned before: University Medical Center, Employment Agency, Building Authorities as well as dormitories for students. A cultural facility which is known in Freiburg is the former electrical company "E-Werk" which is used as an artist's workshop, exhibition rooms or for theater productions.

=== Parks ===
The Stühlinger church square is a very popular place to hang out especially in summer. There are trees and a lawn which is often used for sunbathing and picnics. There is also a playground for children. The Eschholzpark is located between the Max-Weber-Schule and the vocational school center. An oversized garden hose is the most apparent feature of the park. It was created by Coosje van Bruggen and Claes Oldenburg. It is a landmark to remember the horticultural use of the area. The park-like main cemetery in the north is a public space as well.

=== Memorials ===
There are several memorials which were built to remember the history of the city of Freiburg or the district of Stühlinger in particular.

- "Fünfwundenkreuz" (Five Holy Wounds): To remember the fallen and sick soldiers of the German campaign of 1813
- A memorial site to remember the Bombing of Freiburg on 10 May 1940
- The Hebelschule remembers the deported Jews who were forcefully brought to the Gurs internment camp in France with a memorial plaque at the main entrance. The schoolyard was used as central gathering point in the night of October 21, 1940.
- A memorial stone remembers the mental hospital ("Kreispflegeanstalt für geistig und körperlich Behinderte") which was shut down by the Nazis in 1940. In the following months most of the patients were killed as part of the Action T4.
- There are two commemorative tablets on the Wiwilí bridge to commemorate Berndt Koberstein and Albrecht Pflaum, who were killed by the Contras, a Nicaraguan group of rebel groups.
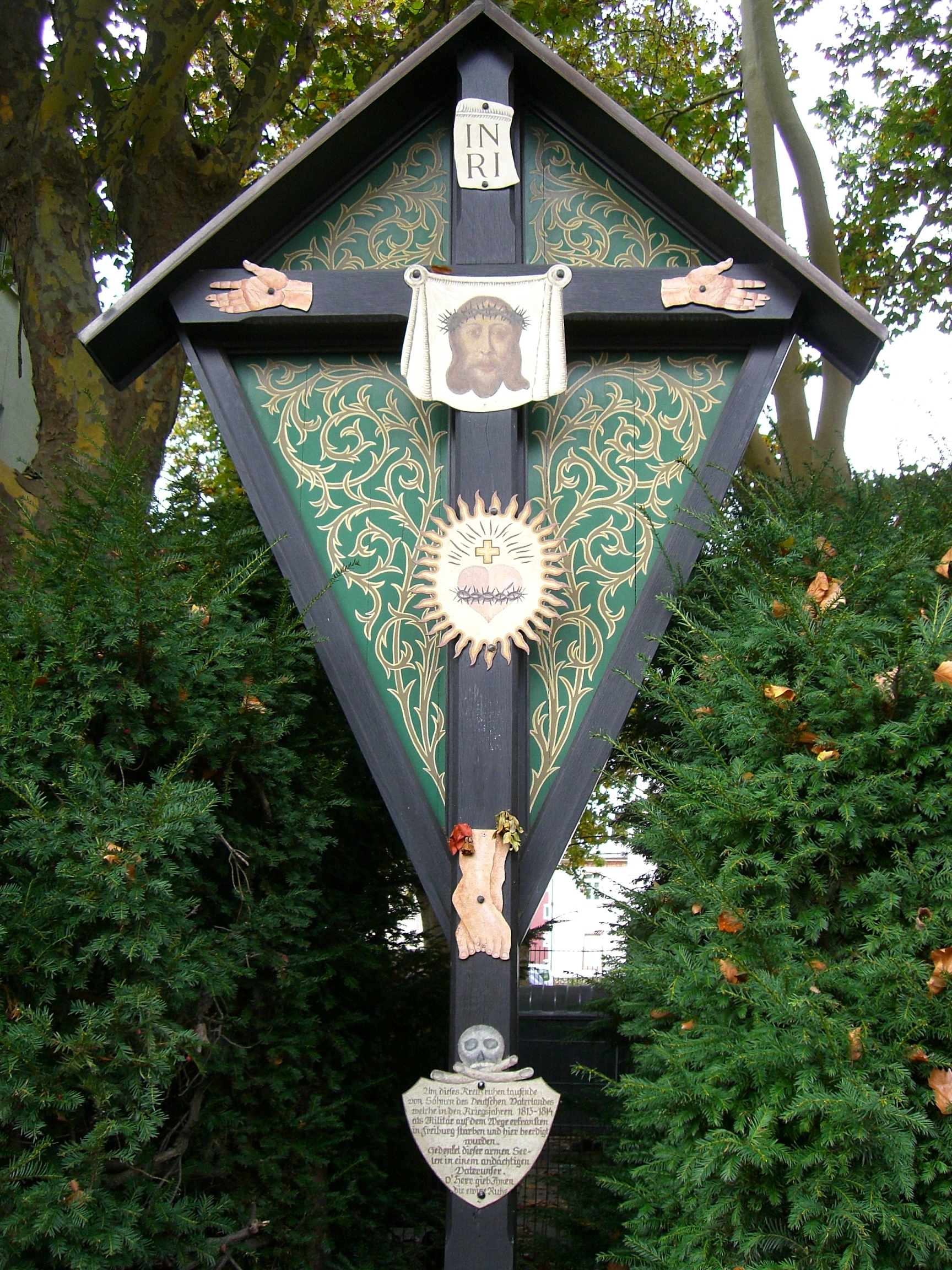
Five Holy Wounds

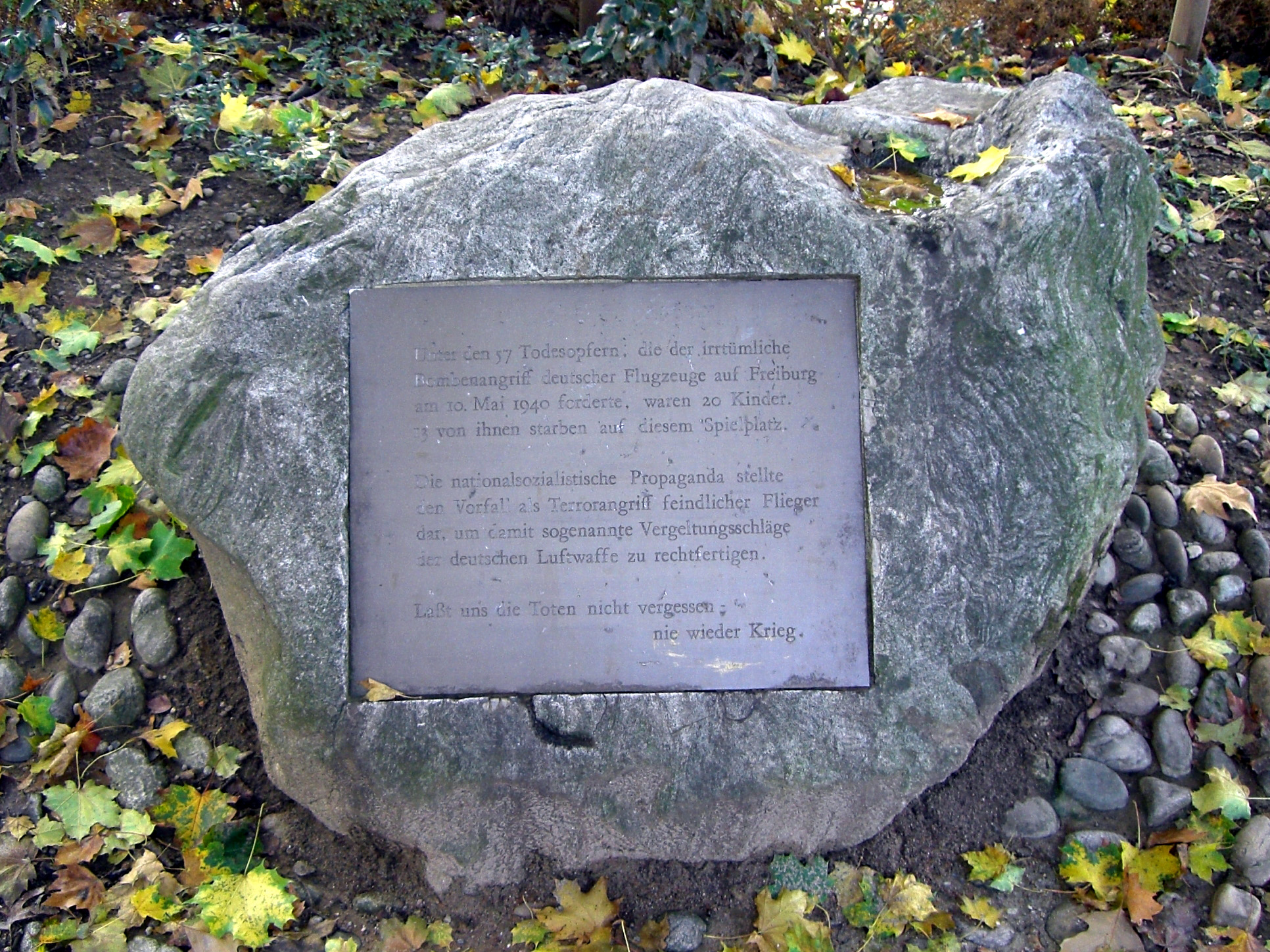
Memorial Site for the Bombing of Freiburg 1940

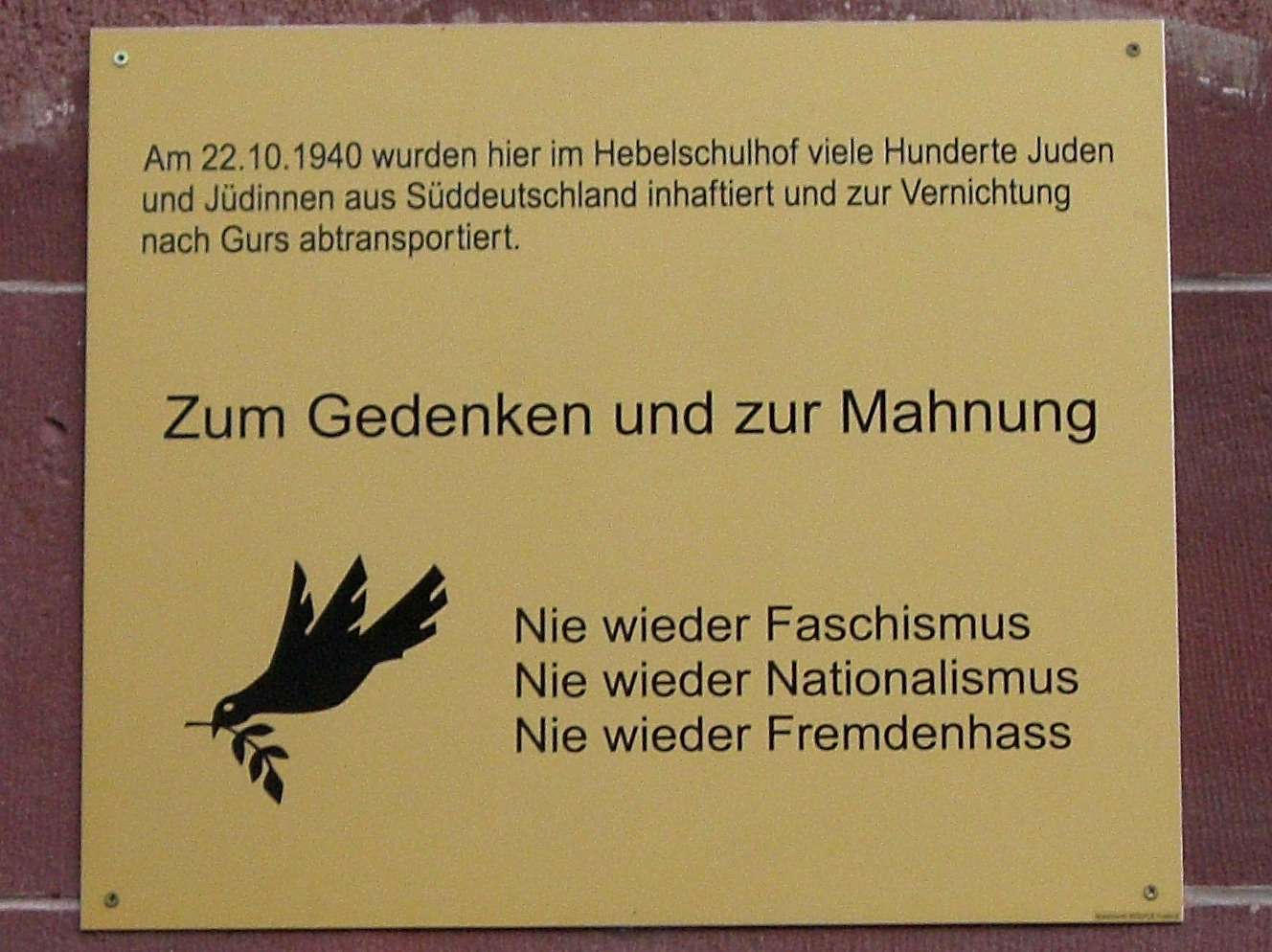
Memorial plaque for deported Jews

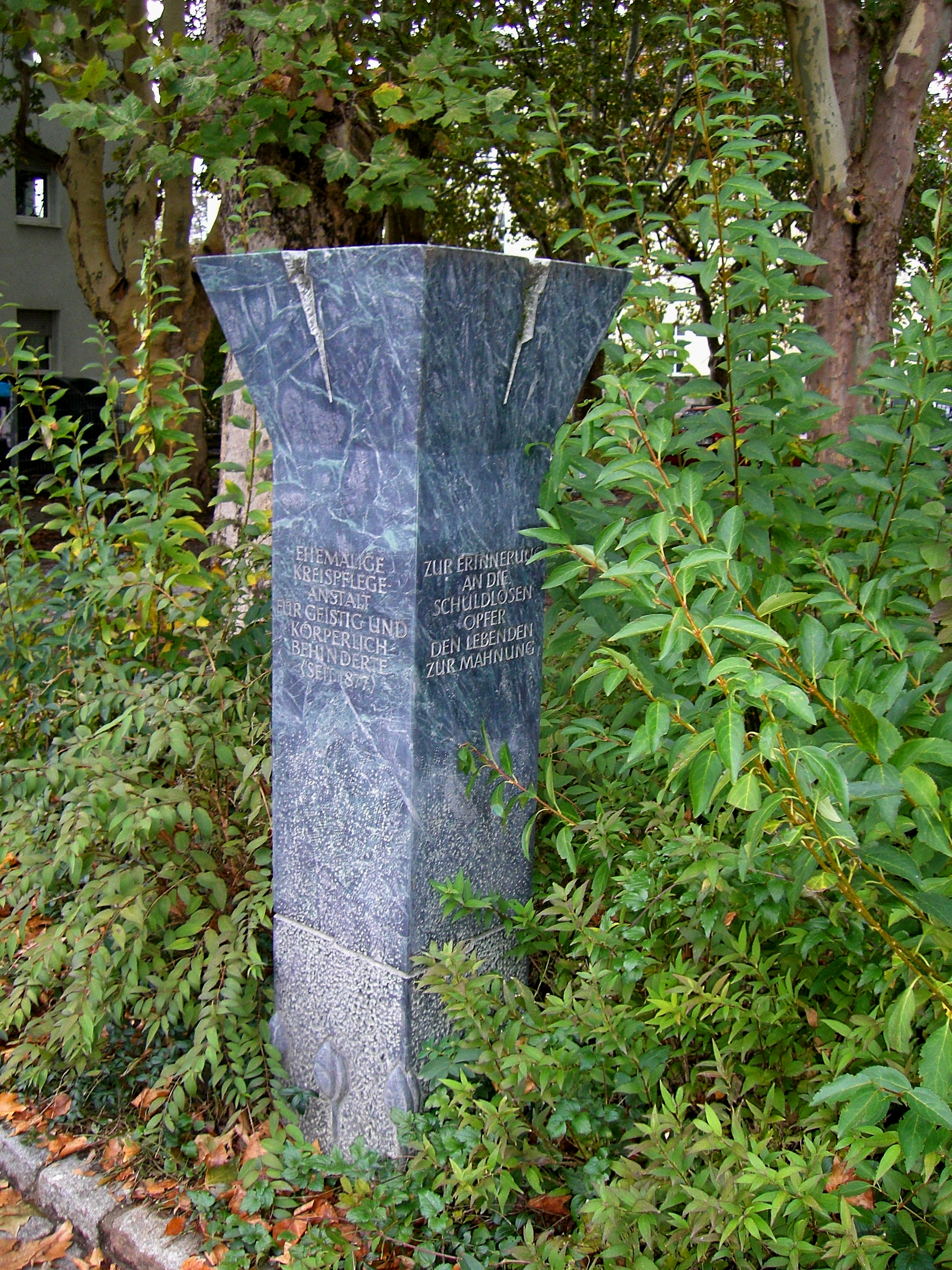
Commemorative stone of the mental hospital
- There are also several Stolpersteine to commemorate victims of the Holocaust.

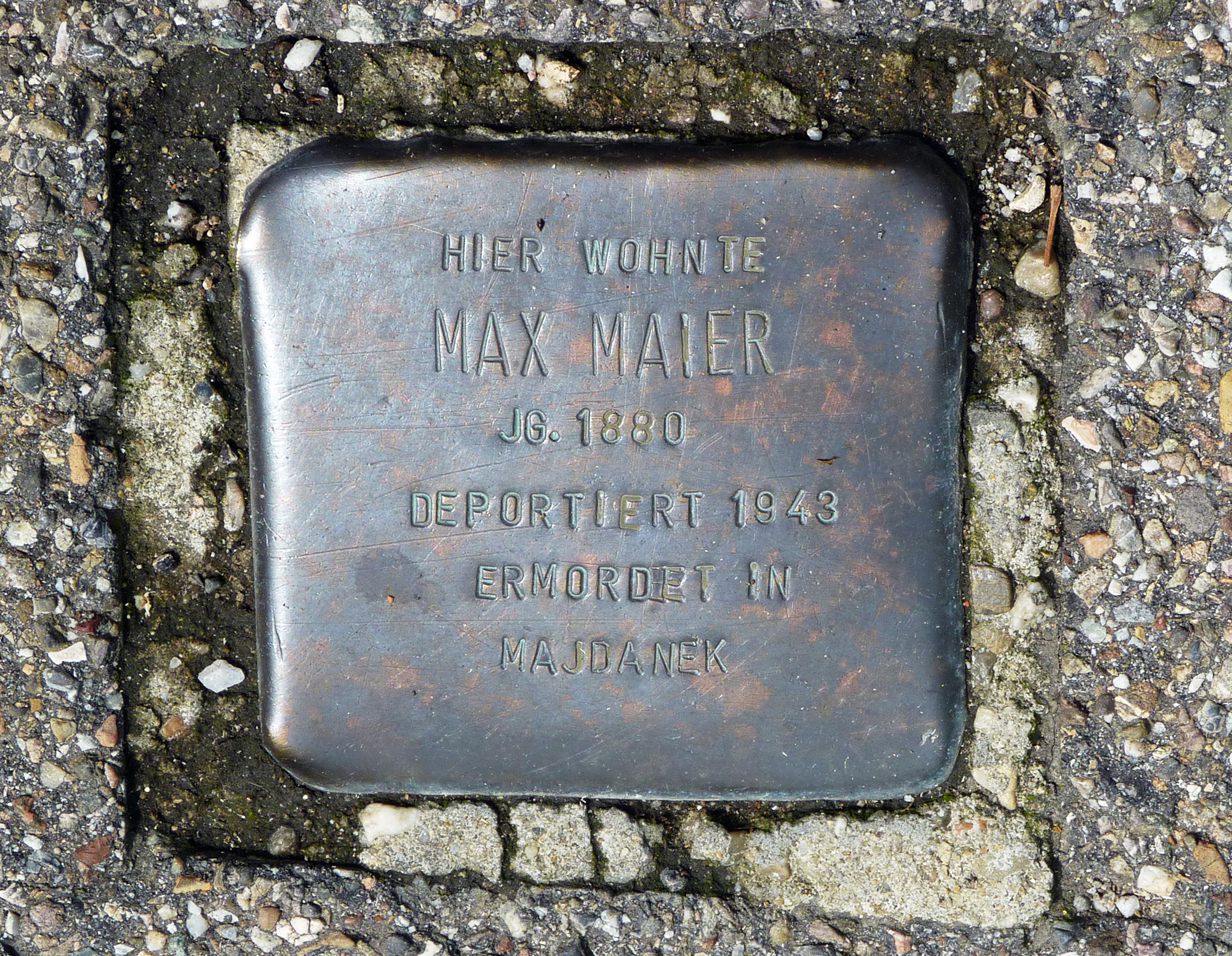
Max Maier-Stolperstein

Name	Year of Birth	Where they lived	Year and destination of deportation	Fate
Karl Balzer	1885	Lehener Straße 14	Imprisoned 1943	Death 18 December 1943, House of Correction in Bruchsal
Leo Bloch	1882	Engelbergerstraße 39	1940 Gurs	1942 Auschwitz; pronounced dead
Nathan Bloch	1878	Engelbergerstraße 39	1940 Gurs	1942 Auschwitz; pronounced dead
Robert Burgheimer	1882	Klarastraße 29	1940 Gurs	Death in Auschwitz
Ida Heilbrunner	1890	Egonstraße 48	1940 Gurs	Killed Auschwitz
Carla Lindemann, geb. Gombrich	1889	Engelbergerstraße 39	1940 Gurs	Death 24 May 1942 in Toulouse
Kurt Lindemann	1876	Engelbergerstraße 39	1940 Gurs	Survived
Max Maier	1880	Fedderstraße 6	1943	Killed in Majdanek
Leo Metzger	1880	Zunftstr. 7	1940 Gurs	Death in Auschwitz
Hedwig Metzger geb. Levi	1892	Zunftstr. 7	1940 Gurs	Death in Auschwitz
Christian Nußbaum	1888	Barbarastr. 1	Imprisoned 1933	Death in a mental hospital 1939
Gustav Adolf Weber	1904	Lehener Straße 14	deserted 1943	shot during his flight on 29 June 1943, in the Rhine near Maxau
