= Bombing of Freiburg on 10 May 1940 =

On 10 May 1940, the Luftwaffe erroneously bombed the city of Freiburg im Breisgau in a case of friendly fire, killing 57 inhabitants.

== Incident ==
The kette (three aircraft) involved, commanded by Leutnant Paul Seidel, were from 8. Staffel, Kampfgeschwader 51 "Edelweiss" (8./KG51) operating the Heinkel He 111 medium bomber. They had taken off at 14:27 from Landsberg-Lech Air Base in Bavaria to bomb the city of Dijon in France, or the alternative target Dole–Jura Airport, as part of the Battle of France. While en route to Dijon, they lost orientation over Germany due to navigation errors and were unable to determine their exact position, but were convinced they had crossed the Rhine into France. They spotted a church spire rising out of the fog, which they mistook for St Martin's Church in Colmar, a French city only 35 kilometres (22 mi) from Freiburg on the opposite side of the Rhine. The spire was in fact from a church in Freiberg. An air raid watch based at the Hilda Tower on the Lorettoberg identified the aircraft as German, so it was only after the attack was already over that air raid warning in Freiburg was given. Starting from 15:59 the planes dropped a total of 69 bombs on the city.

== Aftermath ==
=== Immediate consequences ===
The German leadership immediately tried to cover-up the bombing and passed it off as enemy action, which the state media accepted without any hesitation. UFA's newsreel series Die Deutsche Wochenschau reported in its issue no. 506 on 15 May 1940 describing the incident as the "brutal and ruthless air raid on an unfortified German city". The local newspaper Freiburger Zeitung described it on 11 May 1940 as a "malicious air raid" by the enemy. In the course of this "sneaky, cowardly air raid against all laws of humanity and international law", the newspaper continued "24 civilians were overtaken by death". At the same time the incident was used to justify further attacks against the enemy. Thus, "any further planned bombing of the German population will be counteracted by five times as many German aircraft attacking an English or French town." In a speech to workers at the Borsig factory in Berlin on 10 December 1940, Adolf Hitler accused the British Prime Minister Winston Churchill to have started with "terrorist" attacks against the German civilian population with the bombing of Freiburg.

The Luftwaffe pilots, for their part, declared to have attacked the secondary target Dole Tavaux. However, that declaration was made only later in the year. The claim that the duds of the attack were not German, had already been refuted by the time code. Nevertheless, the myth that foreign aircraft had bombed Freiburg had a long-standing basis. Background for this could have been memories of the air raids during World War I, when Freiburg was bombed 25 times by Allied aircraft. A reinforcing factor might have been the shelling of Freiburg by French artillery on 11 and 13 June 1940. On that occasion shells fell on the southern Lorettoberg, Merzhausen, Günterstal, and the area around the airport as well as on the premises of the company Rhodia and the gasworks. This possibility of attack was eliminated by the advance of the German troops in France from 15 June 1940 onwards.

=== Later consequences ===
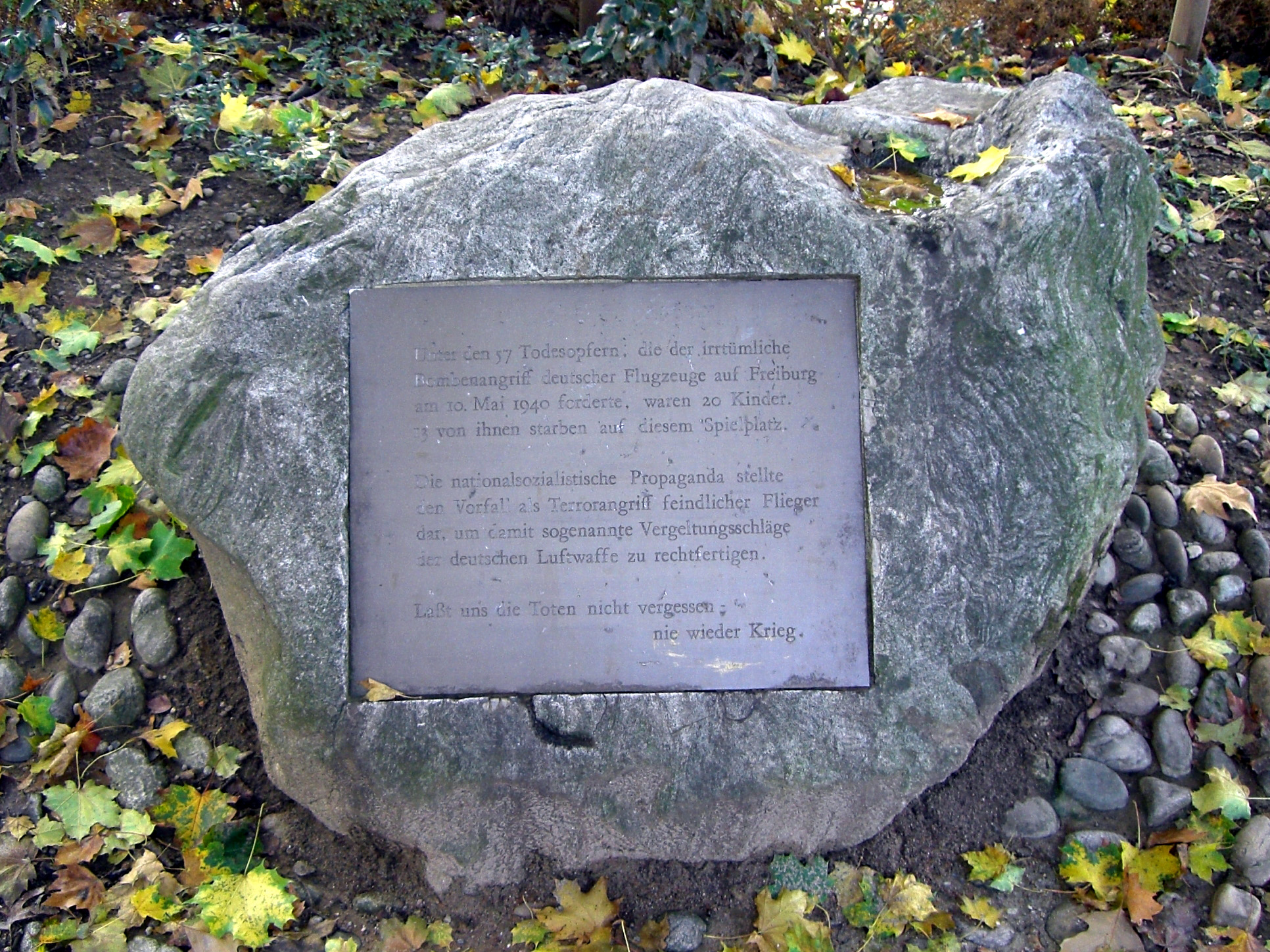
Memorial stone on Hilda Playground

Colonel Josef Kammhuber, at that time commander of KG51, alleged for a long time that it would never be possible to clarify who was responsible for the bombing of Freiburg. In August 1980, however, Kammhuber presented his knowledge regarding the bombing of Freiburg to two military historians: "The fact that the attack on Freiburg was conducted mistakenly by a chain of III/KG51 is evident".

The German historians Anton Hoch, Wolfram Wette and Gerd R. Ueberschär contributed significantly to the clarification of the events on 10 May 1940. In consequence of their work, the persons responsible for the bombing could be identified. On 5 April 1956, The New York Times reported that the puzzle of who bombed Freiburg had been solved. On the Hilda playground in Freiburg's suburb Stühlinger next to which 20 children were killed, a memorial stone refers to the incident. The construction of the memorial stone was initiated by the Union of Persecutees of the Nazi Regime. On the 40th anniversary a preliminary plaque existing only for a short time was installed. It followed up the assumption that Freiburg was intentionally bombed by the German Air Force which was later disproved. The present monument was dedicated on the 45th anniversary. The present inscription on the plaque is based on the findings of historical research about the event. Mayor Rolf Böhme as well as the chairman of the VVN and the chairman of the SPD local association of the suburb Stühlinger spoke at the dedication of the memorial stone.

== See also ==
- Operation Tigerfish: Air raid on Freiburg on 27 November 1944.
