= Herdern (Freiburg) =

- Stadtteil of Freiburg im Breisgau
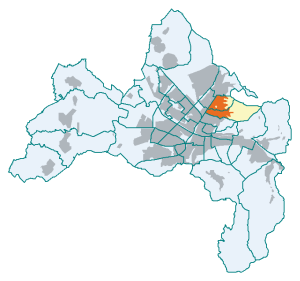
- Location within Freiburg
- Interactive map of Herdern
- Location within Germany Location within Baden-Württemberg
- Coordinates: 48.0089°N 7.8628°E
- Country: Germany
- State: Baden-Württemberg
- District: Urban district
- City: Freiburg im Breisgau

Population (2020-12-31)
  - Total: 12,509
- Time zone: UTC+01:00 (CET)
  - Summer (DST): UTC+02:00 (CEST)

Herdern (German pronunciation: [ˈhɛʁdɐn]) is a quarter (Stadtteil) of Freiburg im Breisgau in Baden-Württemberg, Germany.

== History ==
On September 30, 1008 Henry II issued a deed of donation with which he ceded his exclusive hunting rights (hunting privilege) in the Breisgau forests to the bishop of Basel. Although the village must already have existed for quite some time, this is the very first official document in which it is mentioned.

Herdern was incorporated into Freiburg already in 1457.

== Glasbach ==
The Glasbach (translated: Glass Stream) is a stream which has its source on Mount Rosskopf and flows from east to west through Herdern.

== Eichhalde ==
Eichhalde is a hillside (Eich means Oak and Halde just means Hillside). Eichhalde is also the name of a 1.5 km long scenic road along the hillside above Herdern. Above this scenic road there is a large meadow, the Eichhalde meadow, which is located in the nature reserve Roßkopf-Schlossberg. It is a local recreation area. At the lower side of the street the last vineyard of Herden is situated.

== Horse Meadow ==
The Horse Meadow is located alongside the street Sonnhalde. It is part of a small recreation area. Until 2006 the meadow was classified as a nature reserve. Above the meadow, on the sidewalk of the Sonnhalde street, there were several wooden benches where one could enjoy a good view of the west of Freiburg and its surroundings. It was a popular place both for locals and tourists to visit. Despite protests, the city of Freiburg decided to allow the construction of four townhouses on this meadow. So far, there has not yet been any interest in buying any of these apartments, because the costs are by far too high.

== Jägerhäusle ==
The Jägerhäusle (translated: Hunters cottage), an ancient forest house, was a popular restaurant. In 1971 the building was demolished and, between 1971 and 1974, a new hotel and restaurant was built nearby which is much larger than the old restaurant.

== Sculpture Meadow ==
Sculpture Meadow is the name given to a meadow above Herdern on the Waltersberg hillside, because since 1995 this meadow has been used for an open-air exhibition of the artistic works of the sculptor Roland Phleps. These are concrete art sculptures in brilliant steel in different shapes such as spirals, cubes, rods, ellipses or wind wheels.

== Immental valley ==
The Immental is a small valley on the western hillside of the Roßkopf. It was mentioned for the first time in a written document of the year 1234 as Winmarsthal. Across this valley and Herden runs the stream Immentalbach. Above there is a fountain whose enclosure consists of rocks. For many citizens of Freiburg its drinking water was of great importance in the 1940s after the collapse of the city's infrastructure as a consequence of the massive bombardment on November 27, 1944, in World War II.

== High altitude trail ==
The high altitude trail of Herdern (Herdermer Höhenweg) is a cultural and scenic trail that begins and ends at the Church Square and was inaugurated in 2012. Along the trail there are boards informing about the suburb's history.

== Lalli carnival guild ==
The Lalli carnival guild of Herdern is a jester guild that was founded in 1930. Its members call themselves Lallis (lalli is the alemannic word for tongue). The Ribbon Dance (Bändeltanz) is the dance which the Lallis perform every Carnival Sunday at 2 o'clock in the afternoon at the Church Square in Herdern. In 1980, on the occasion of the 50th anniversary of the Lallis, the Lalli Fountain (Lallibrunnen) was inaugurated with a nocturnal torchlight procession.

== Botanical Garden ==
The Botanical Garden shows a variety of plants from different countries.
