= Freiburg Castle =

Vanished castle in Baden-Württemberg, Germany

Freiburg Castle on the Schlossberg
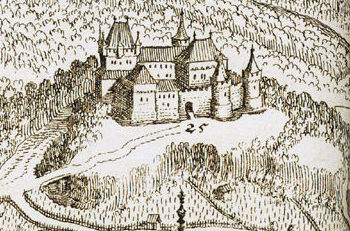
- The motte-and-bailey castle in the Topographia Germaniae by Matthäus Merian

Highest point
- Elevation: 376.3 m (1,235 ft)
- Coordinates: 47°59′37.4″N 7°51′29.5″E

Geography
- Location within Baden-Württemberg
- Location: Baden-Württemberg, Germany
- Parent range: Black Forest

Freiburg Castle is a vanished castle. When it existed it was usually called the Burghaldenschloss (motte-and-bailey castle). Only earthworks exist today.

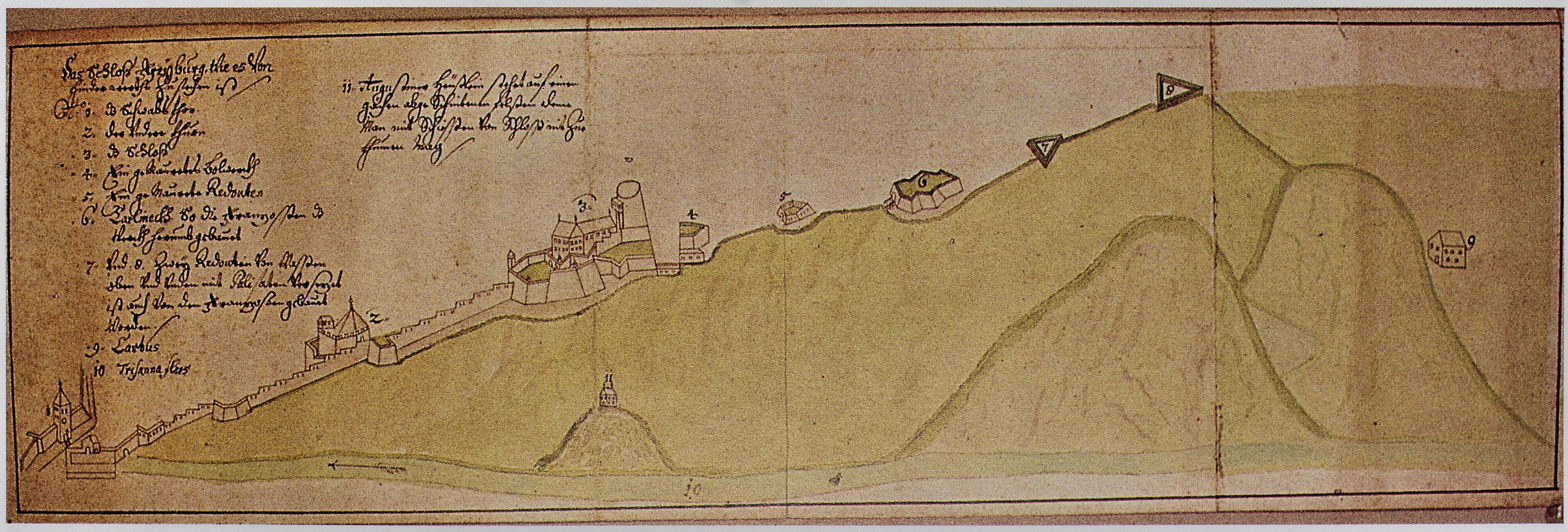
Historic illustration of the castle hill, a spur of the Roßkopf

== Location ==
It stood on the Schlossberg (castle hill) above the city of Freiburg in Baden-Württemberg. The location was at 376.3 m (1,235 ft) above sea level around an elevation which today is called Ludwigshöhe. Beneath the Ludwigshöhe Roman stone mosaics were found in 1819. The remains of a Roman villa or fortress suggest that the mountain must already have been of strategic importance during the time of the Roman settlement of the Rhine Valley.

== History ==
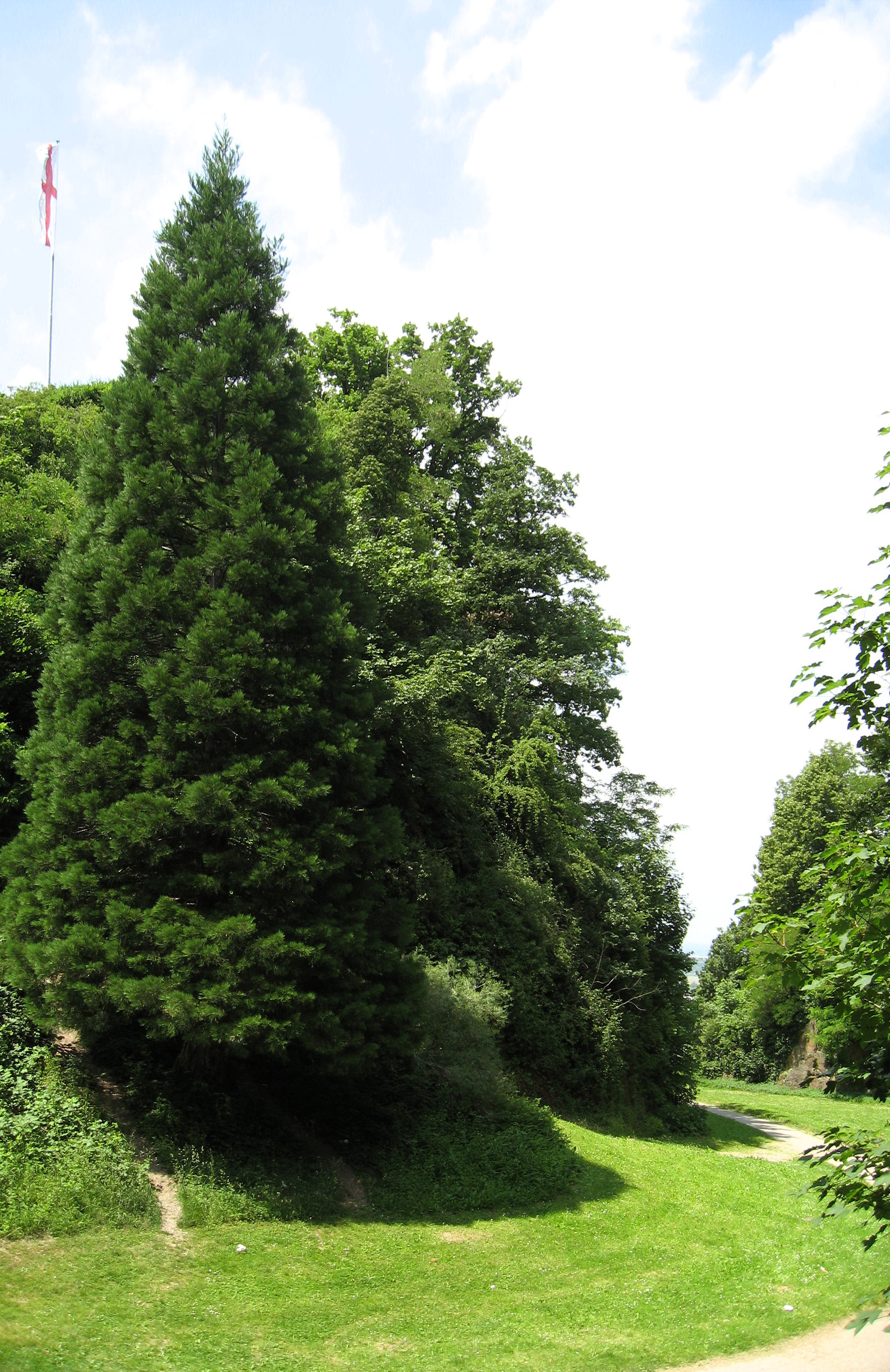
Remains of the castles, fortresses and fortifications on the front of the castle hill. The debris cone on the left is a viewing platform. On the right the incision of the covered neck ditch is visible for which the rocks had to be carved out.

=== House of Zähringen ===
Already in 1091 the duke Berthold II of Zähringen ordered the construction of the Castrum de Friburch on the Schlossberg (castle hill) of Freiburg in beautiful Romanesque style. This castle was praised later by the poet Hartmann von Aue. The Duke's servants and craftsmen lived at the foot of the mountain in the area of what today is the southern part of the historic center, but it was only in 1120 when his son Konrad, with the approval of emperor Henry IV, granted the settlement market rights, thus ending the startup phase of Freiburg.

The existence of the castle is proved at least since 1146 when Bernhard of Clairvaux described in his travel diaries how he healed a blind boy apud castrum Frieburg (at the fort Freiburg). [1] To distinguish it from Zähringen castle above the village of the same name north of Freiburg this castle was called the Burghaldenschloss (motte-and-bailey castle). Throughout history, fires and acts of war on several occasions destroyed the fortified buildings on castle hill, but the castle was rebuilt various times by the respective rulers because of its strategic importance for the protection of Freiburg and to control the access to the Black Forest and the Dreisam valley.

=== Counts of Freiburg ===
After the end of the Zähringer in 1218 the dominion of the city Freiburg went over to the counts of Urach who from then on called themselves counts of Freiburg and resided in the castle above Freiburg. The relationship between the citizen and their lords was often disturbed by disputes regarding the financial obligations of the city. Twice the citizens of Freiburg occupied the castle. In the war against their ruler count Egino II and his brother-in-law, the bishop of Strasbourg Konrad von Lichtenberg, in 1299 they used catapults against the castle for the purpose of blowing a breach. When Count Egino III. 1366 tried to enter with his legions in the city at night it came to the war in which the citizens of Freiburg devastated with canons the "most beautiful castle in the German lands". Thereupon the relationship between the ruling counts of Freiburg and the city was completely shattered.

=== House of Habsburg ===
The citizens ransomed themselves from their former rulers, the counts of Freiburg, with a lump-sum payment of 15,000 silver marks and submitted themselves voluntarily to the protection of the house of Habsburg in 1368. Generously the new ruler, Leopold III, Duke of Austria, handed the ruins of the castle over to the Freiburgers. The city repaired the fortifications just provisionally so that the castle could be taken easily by the enemy in the German Peasants' War in 1525 as well as in the Thirty Years' War.

==== Leopoldsburg (Leopold's castle) ====
Later emperor Leopold I built a mountain fortification including the motte-and-bailey castle in 1668, the "Leopoldsburg", as a bulwark in defense of the threat to the Breisgau imposed by Louis XIV of France.

=== Dutch War ===
Nevertheless, already in 1677 during the Dutch War, the French conquered city and fortress. When in 1679 following the treaties of Nijmegen the Habsburgers had to cede Freiburg to the crown of France the Schlossberg experienced its greatest changes.

==== Vauban's fortification ====
Louis XIV instructed his military engineer Sébastien Le Prestre de Vauban to fortify the city of Freiburg including the Schlossberg with the Vieux Châteaux (French for: "old castle") in accordance with modern requirements and standards as a French outpost in Further Austria and had it surrounded with a fortress ring along the slope. In 1681, the king himself came to Freiburg with a large entourage to inspect the construction works and also visited the castle.

=== War of the Palatine Succession ===
After the war of the Palatine Succession, in the treaty of Ryswick in 1697, Louis XIV had to give up Freiburg. This negative result for the crown of France was glossed over in a French memorandum as follows: The King has given up some places which were not useful for him... Freiburg was not useful enough for the king to perceive its return as a loss, it has returned to be in the bosom of the empire and the care of the emperor, who is also its prince. [2]

=== War of the Spanish Succession ===
In the War of the Spanish Succession, the fortress occupied with a strong Austrian garrison was beleaguered and taken again by French troops under Marshal Louis Hector de Villars. In Rastatt the return of the fortress to Germany was agreed upon, which happened in 1715.

=== War of the Austrian Succession ===
Afterwards again war broke out, that time the war of the Austrian Succession. In autumn 1744, the French again occupied Freiburg as allies of Frederick the Great, king of Prussia. Louis XV of France observed personally from the Lorettoberg the progress made in the siege of the city and was nearly hit by a stray cannonball of the defenders. One year later, in the treaty of Dresden, Freiburg was returned to the Habsburgers. However, before the French left the city they destroyed Vauban's fortifications practically completely so that of the former castle (whose main component was a donjon shown on illustrations) only a debris cone and the neck ditch remained. As a consequence of the extensive destructions of the castle and the fortifications surrounding the city a vast field of ruins covered the hill and the city for the following decades.

== Historic illustrations ==
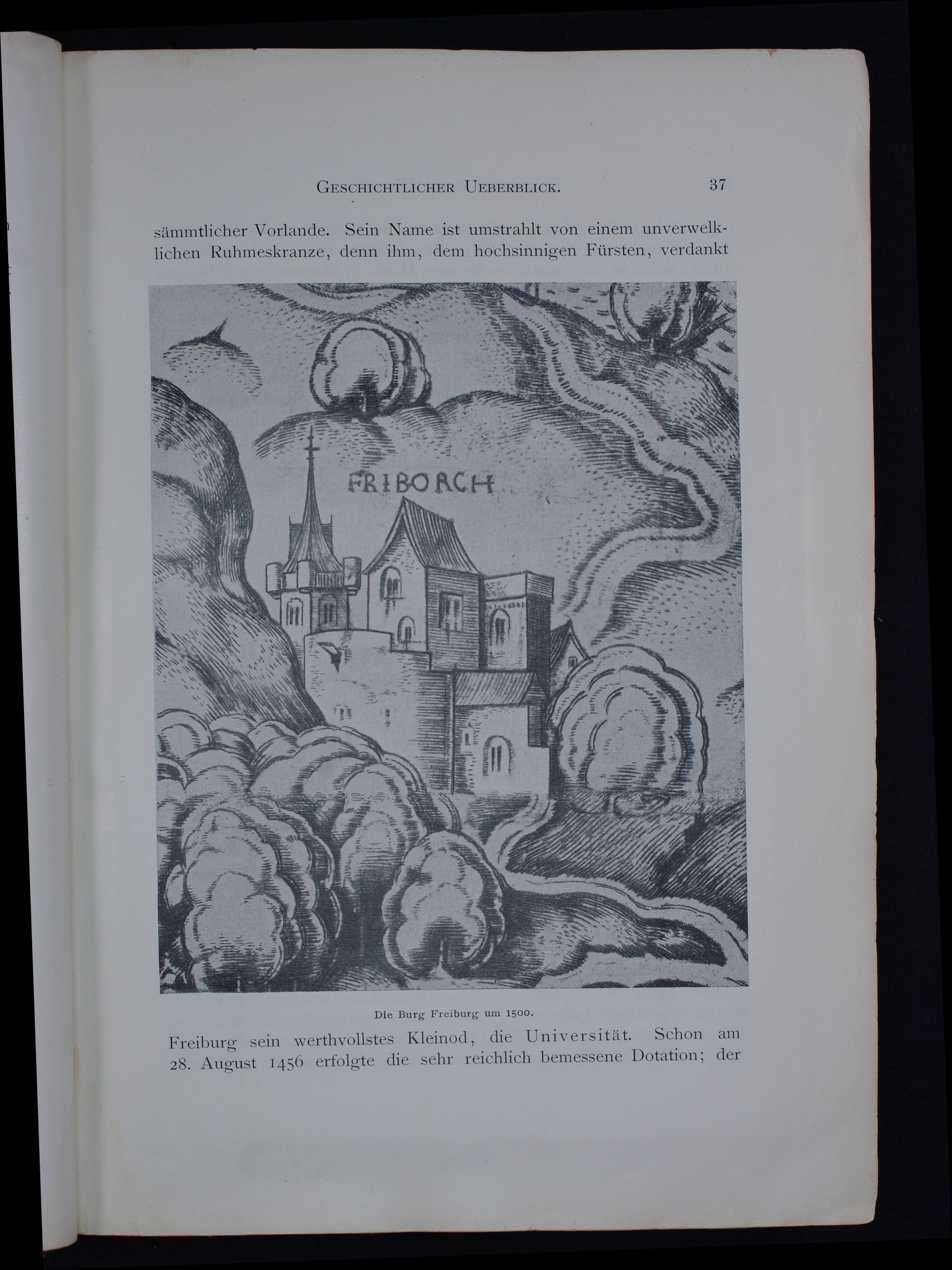
The castle around 1500

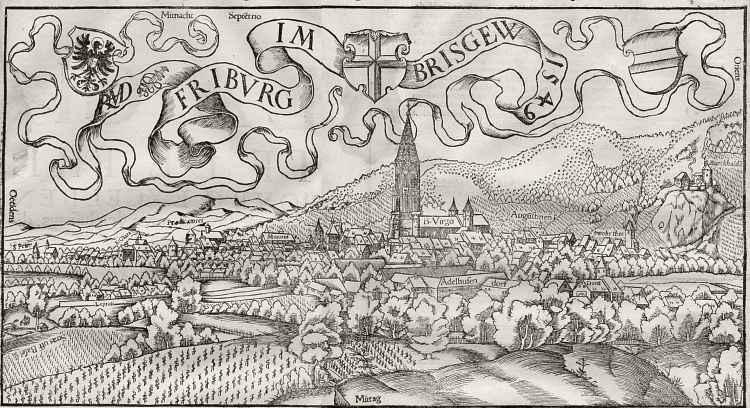
1549 (castle on the right)

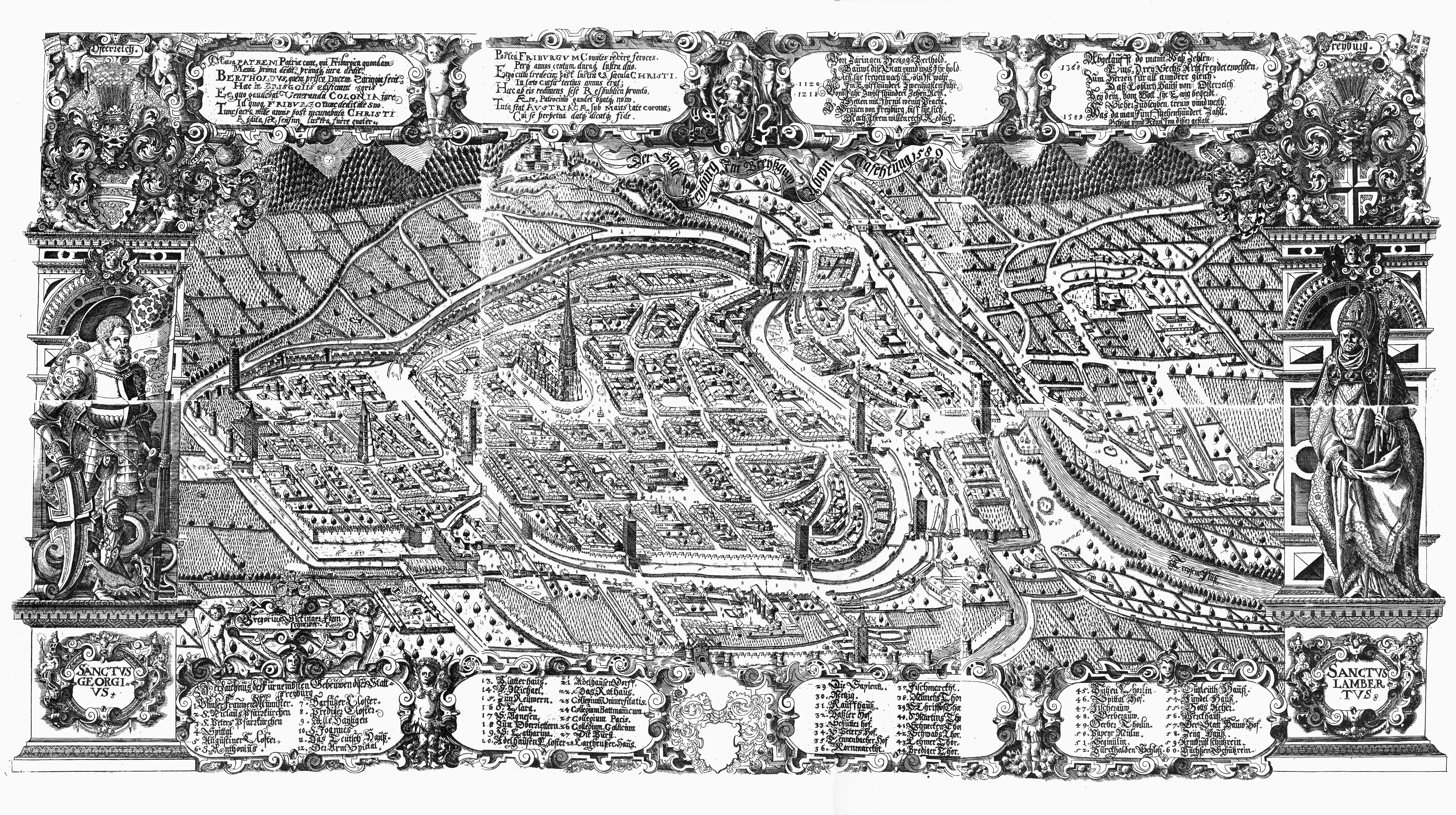
1589 (Schlossberg with castle above the cathedral)

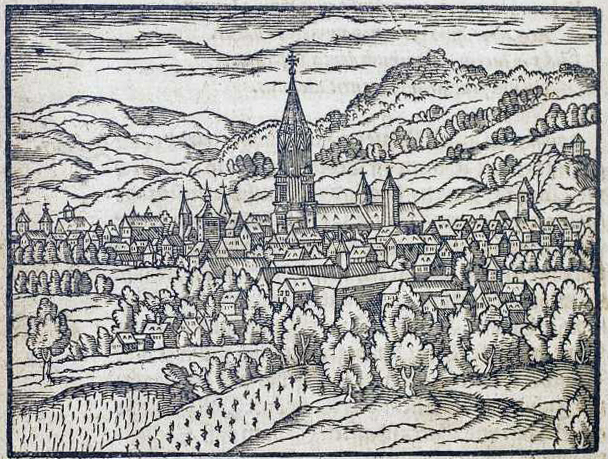
1610 (castle on the right)

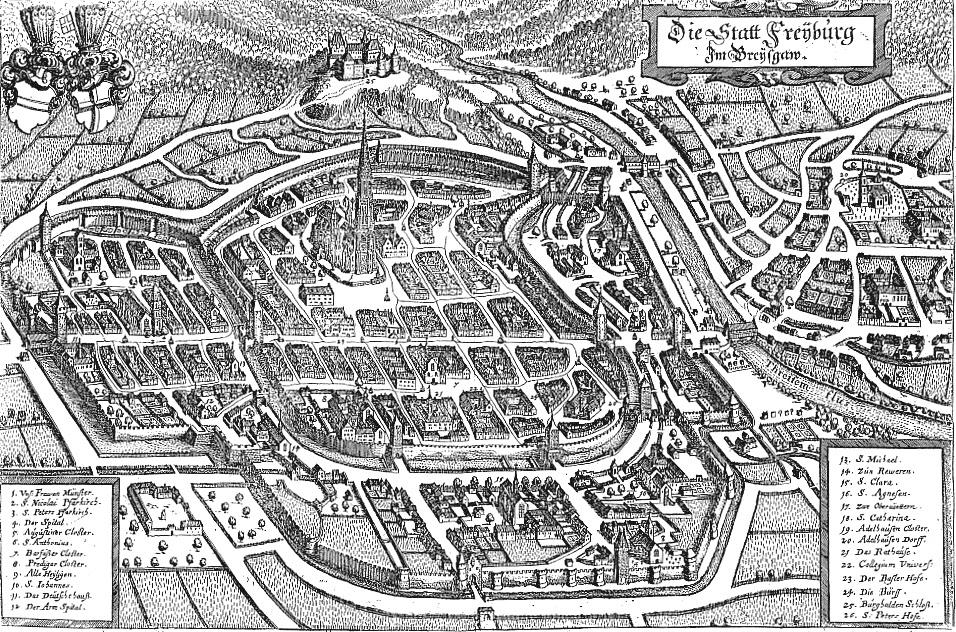
1644 (Schlossberg with castle above the cathedral)

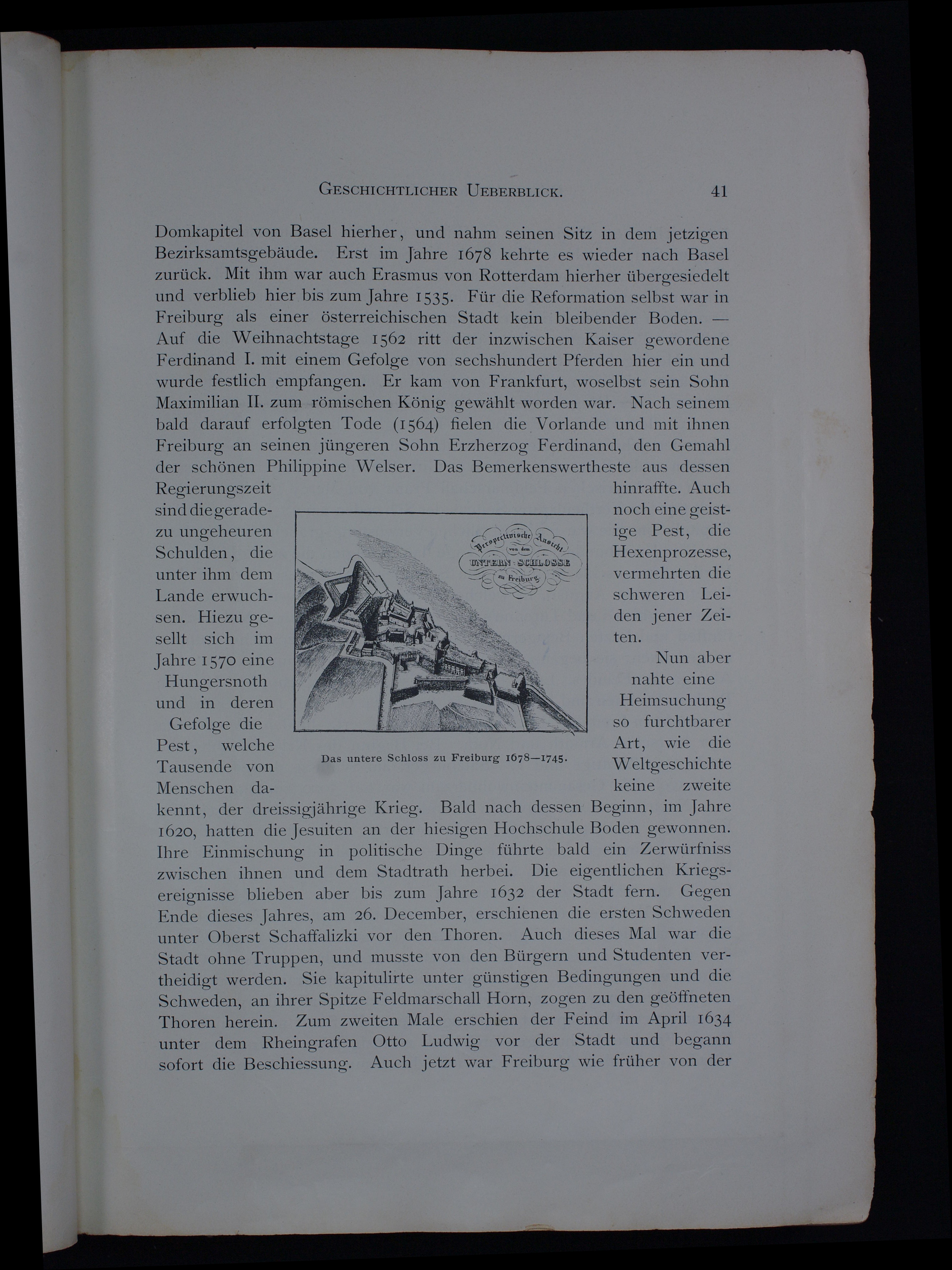
The castle 1678-1745

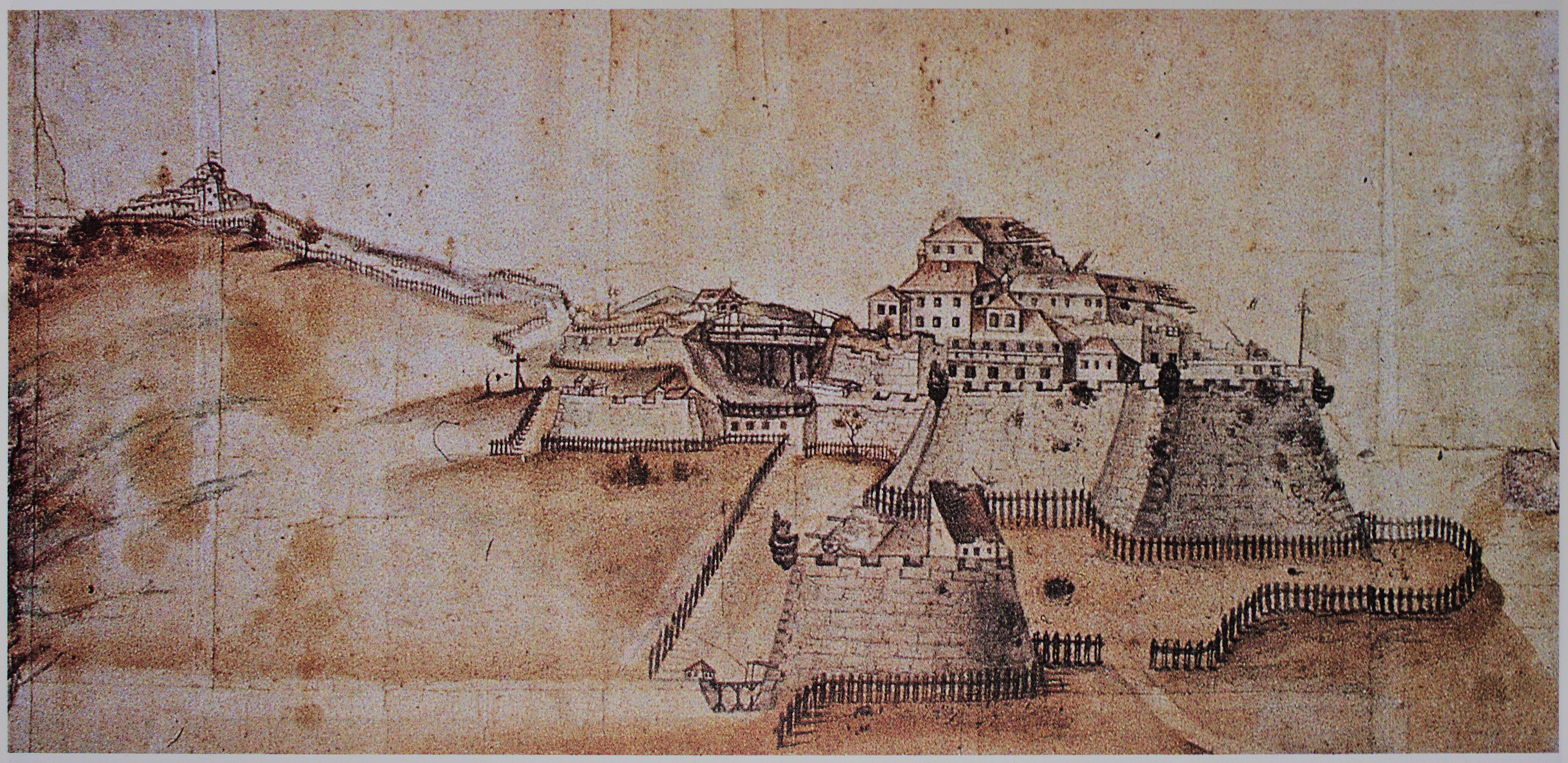
Lower castle 1713

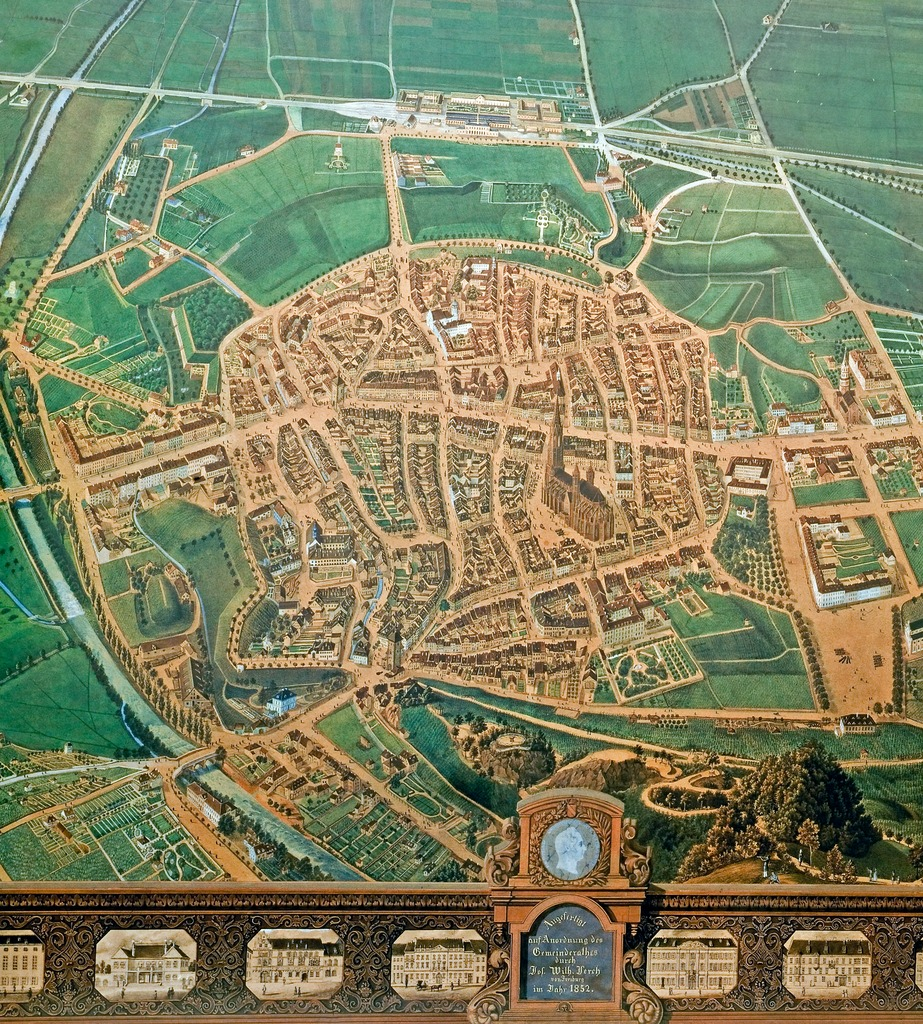
View from the Schlossberg 1852

== Historic maps ==
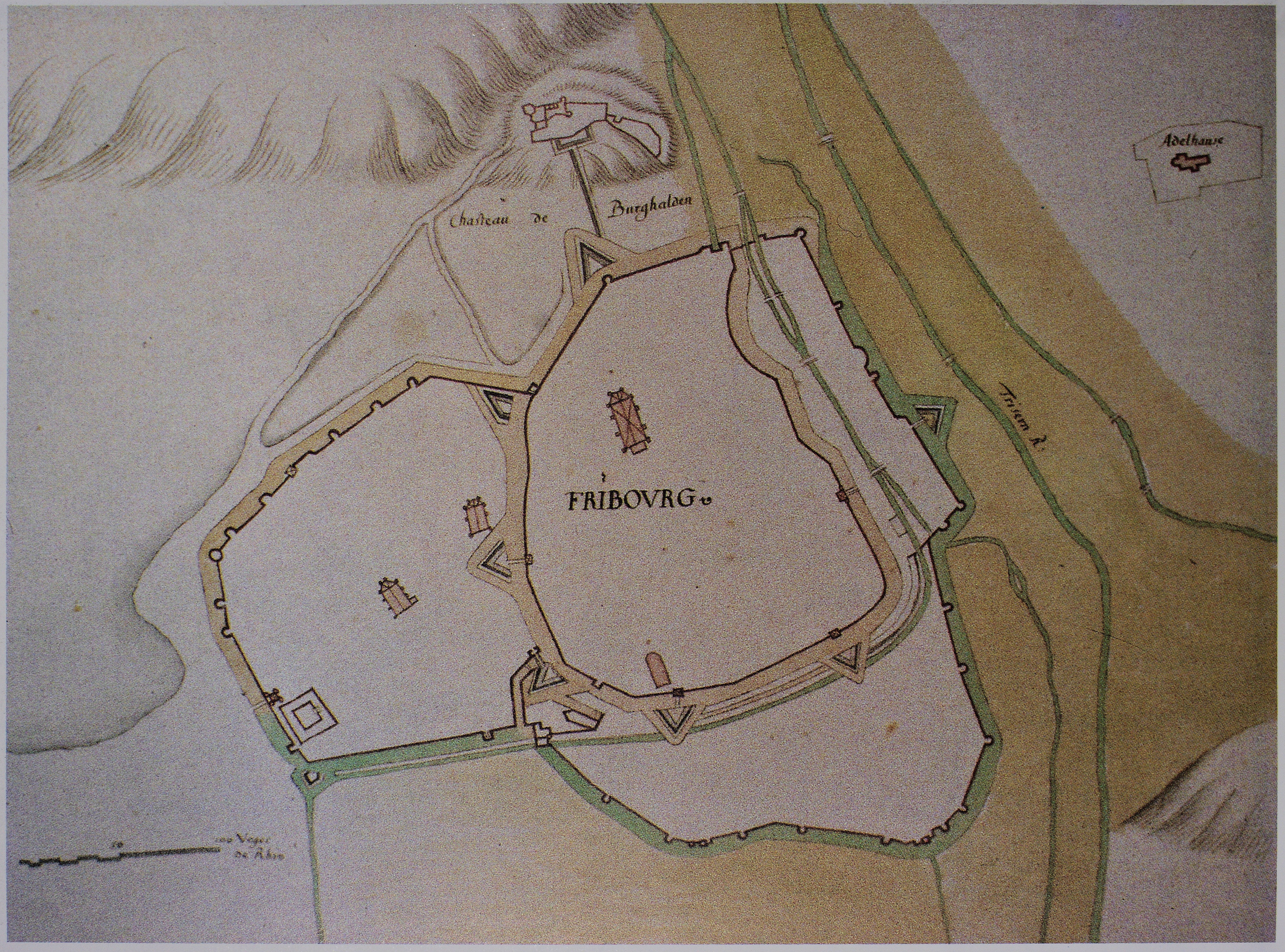
1638

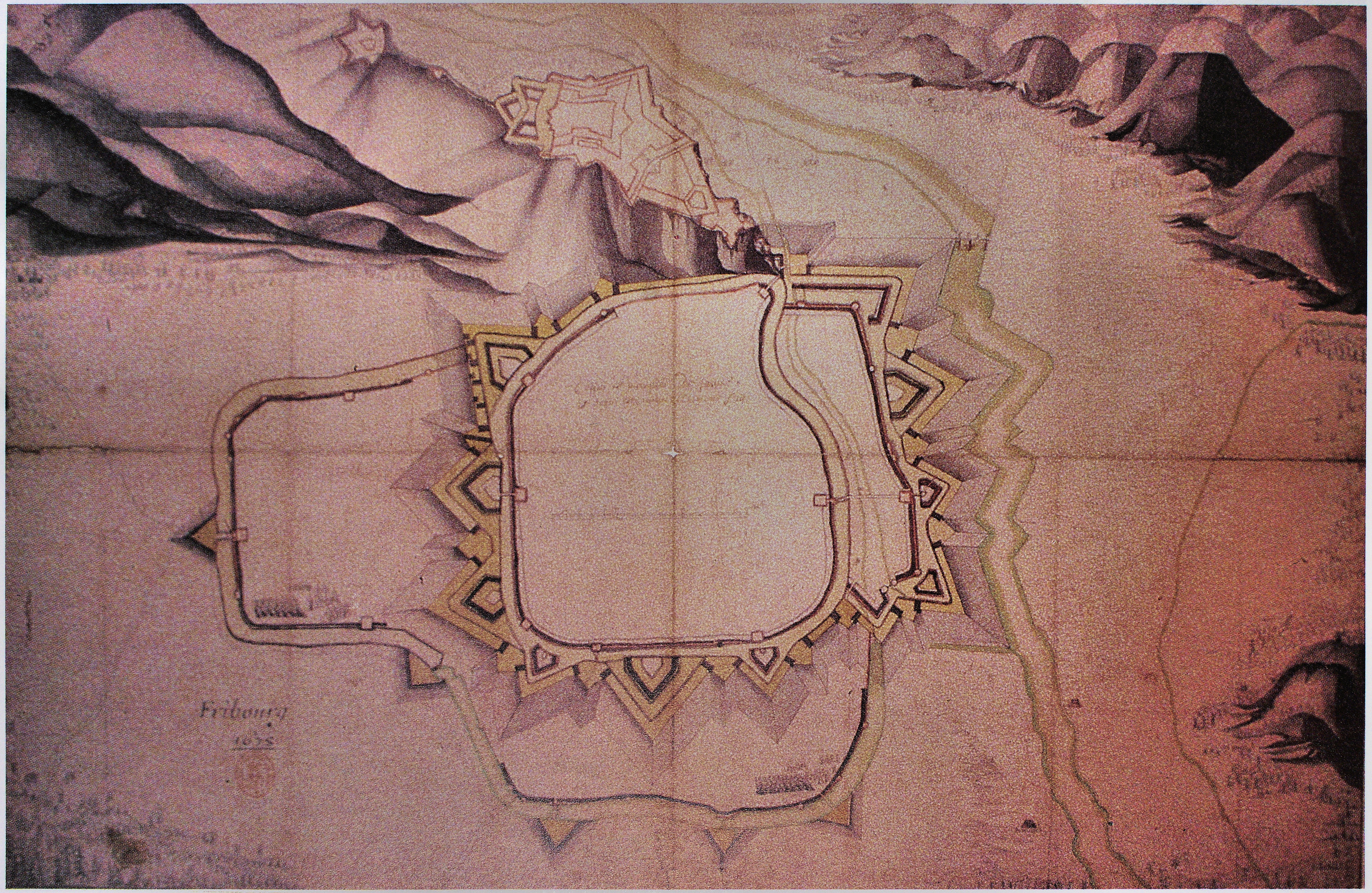
1678

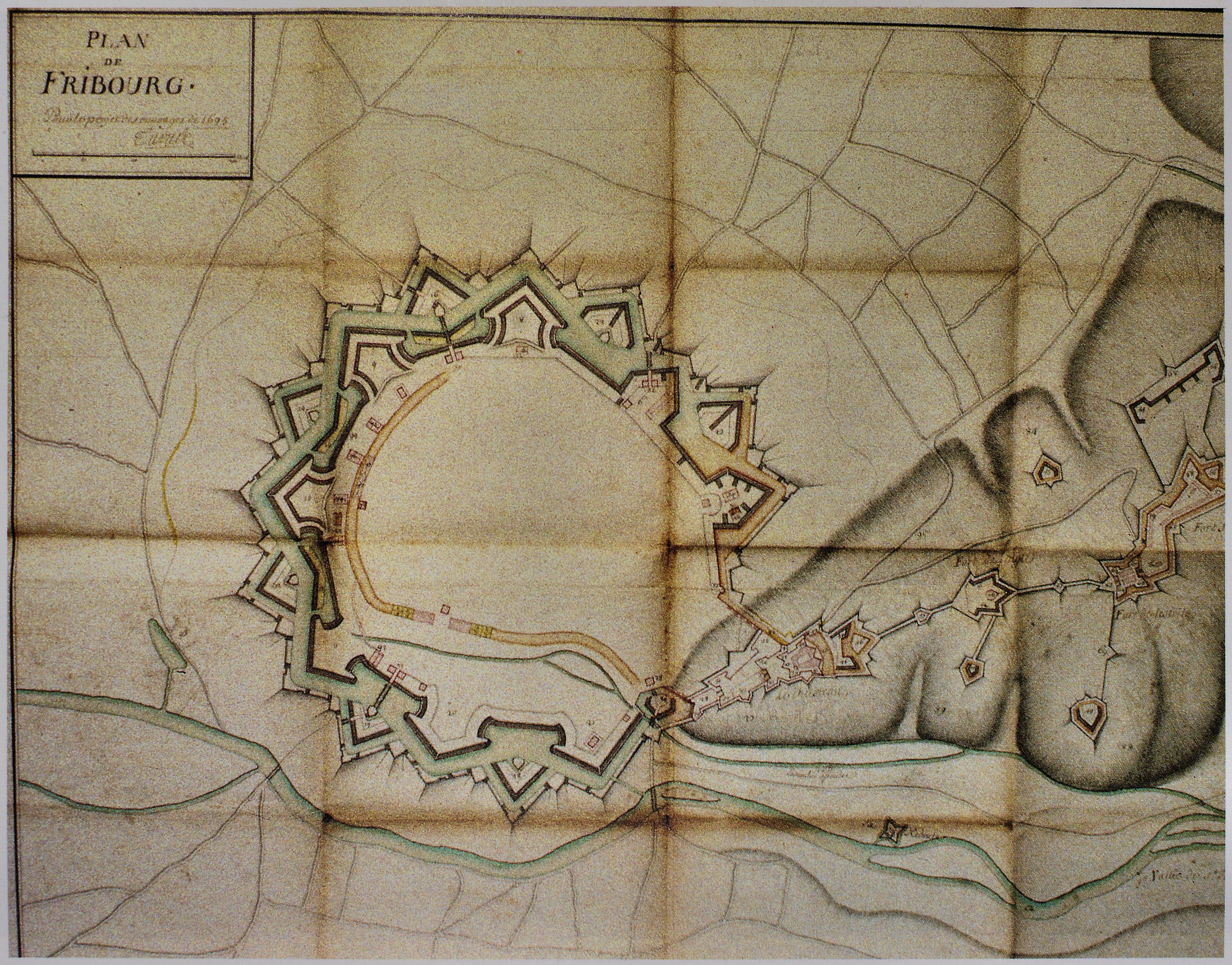
1694

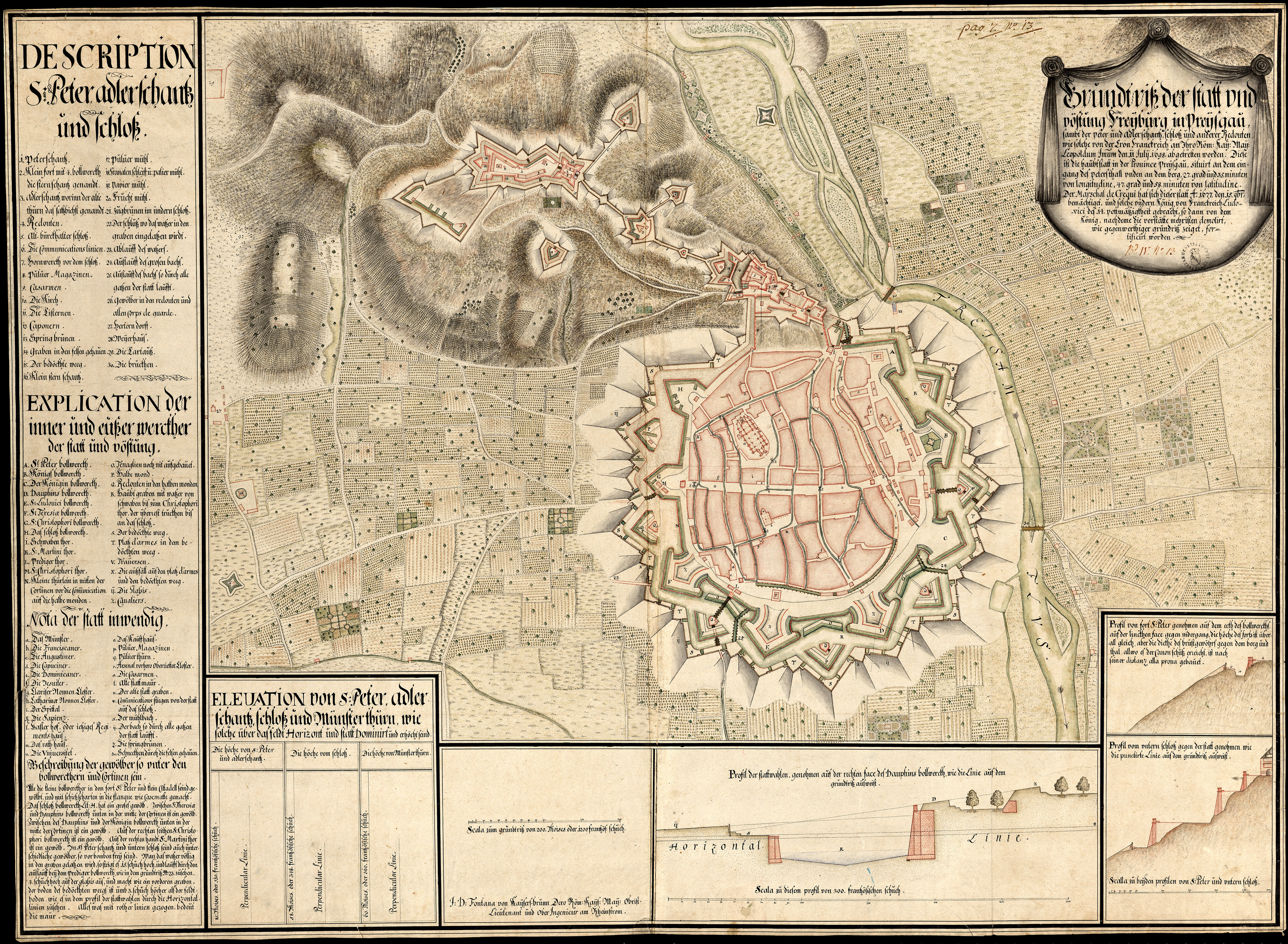
1698

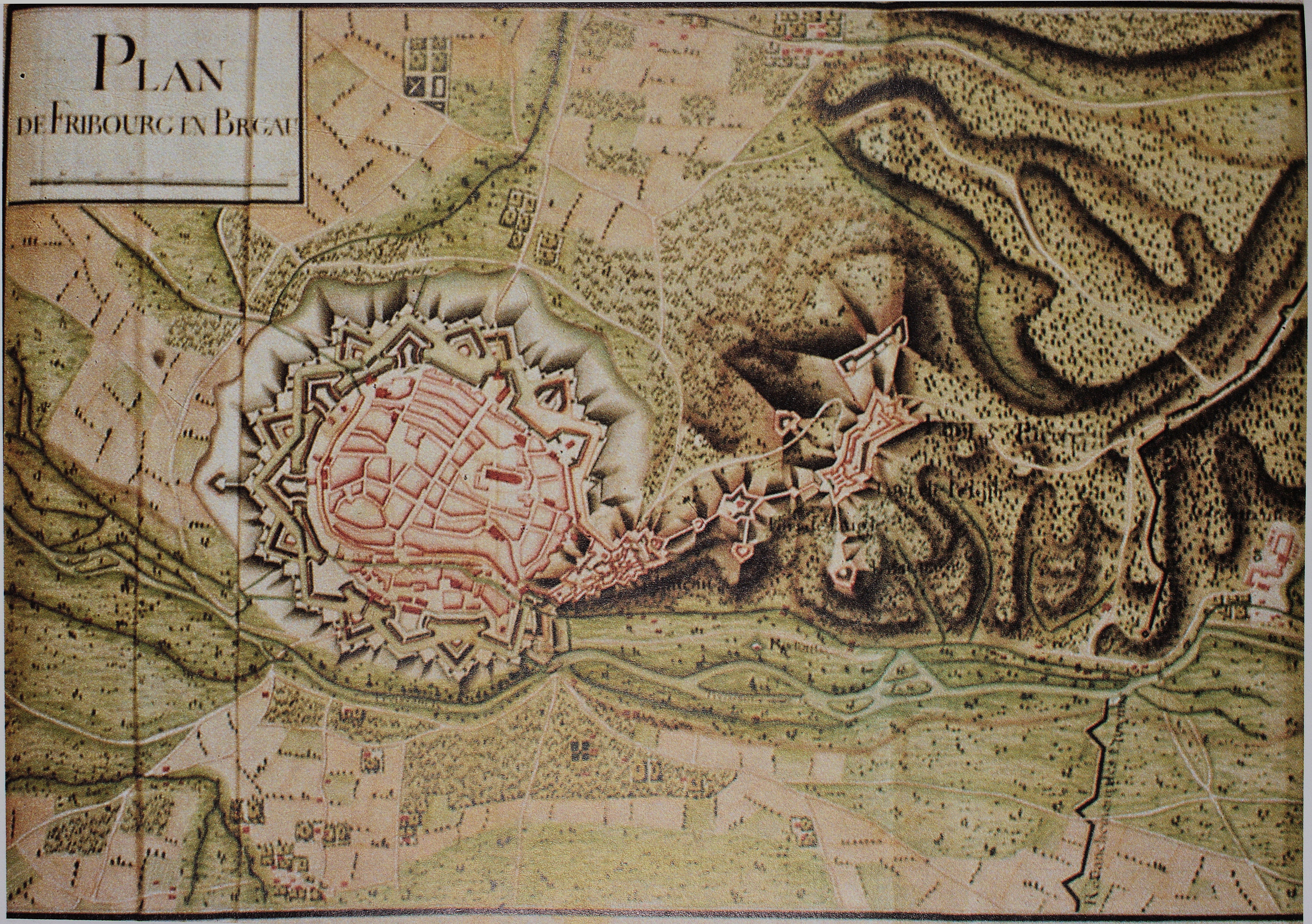
1713
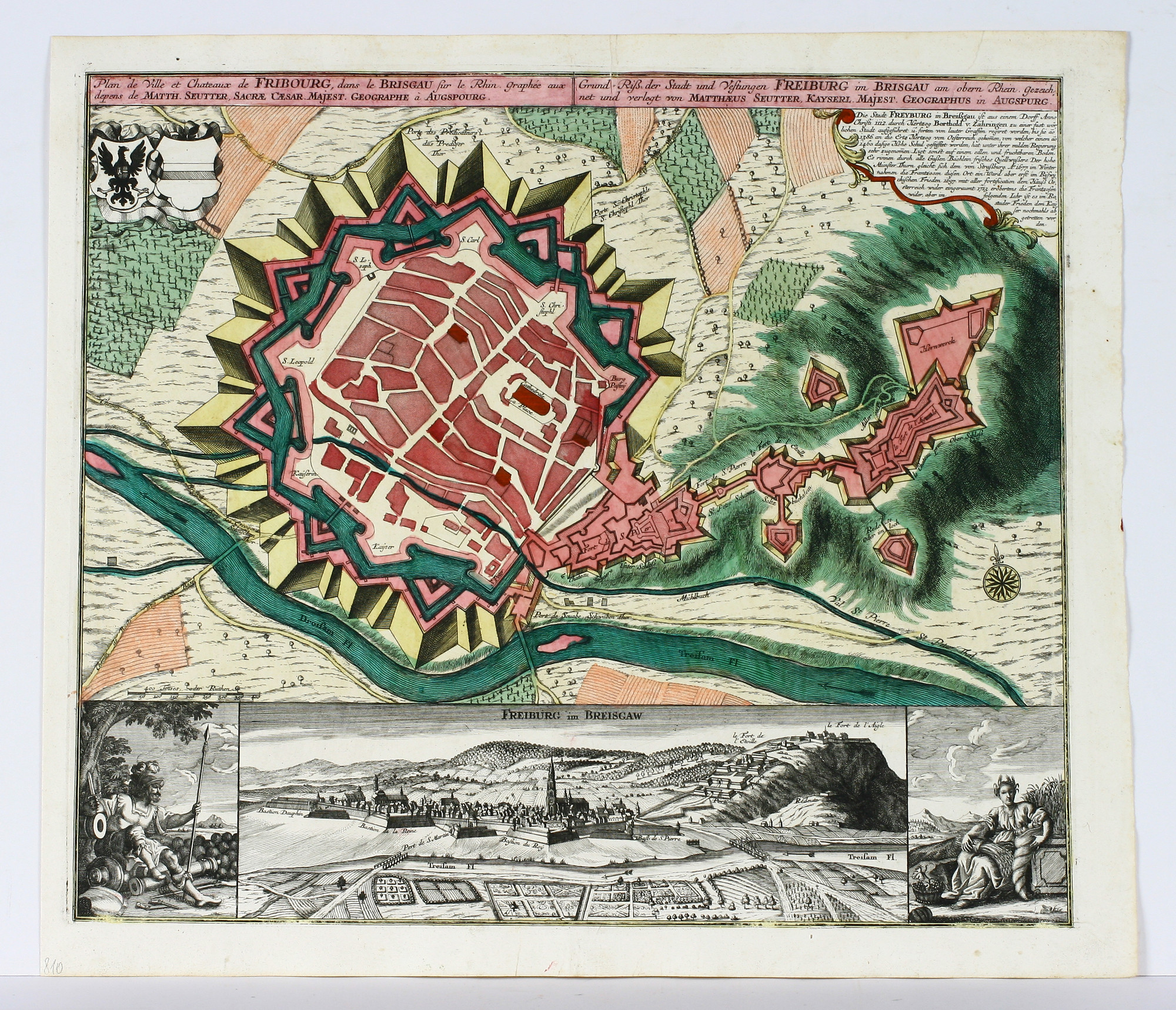
around 1730

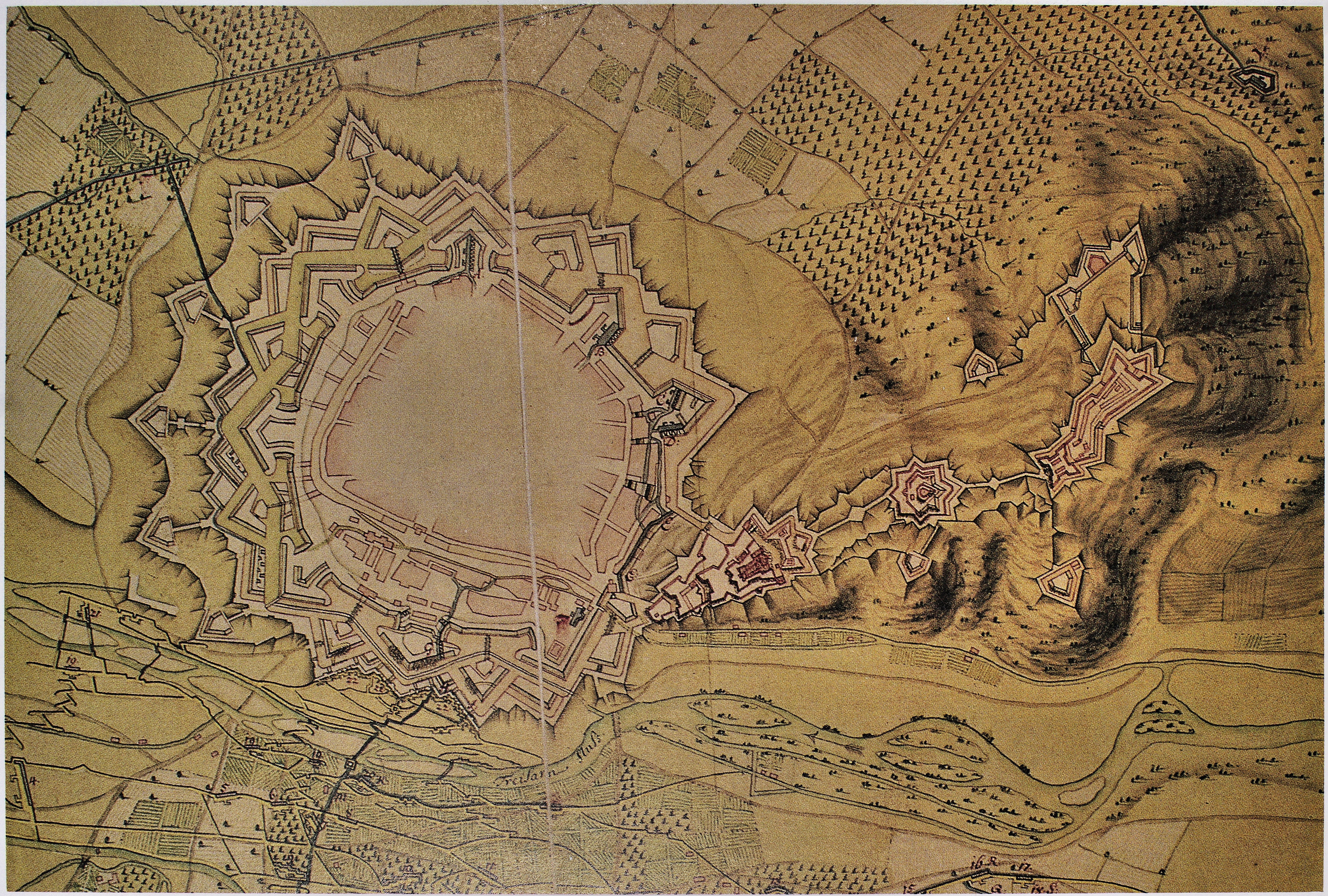
Map of the castle and the fortifications 1744

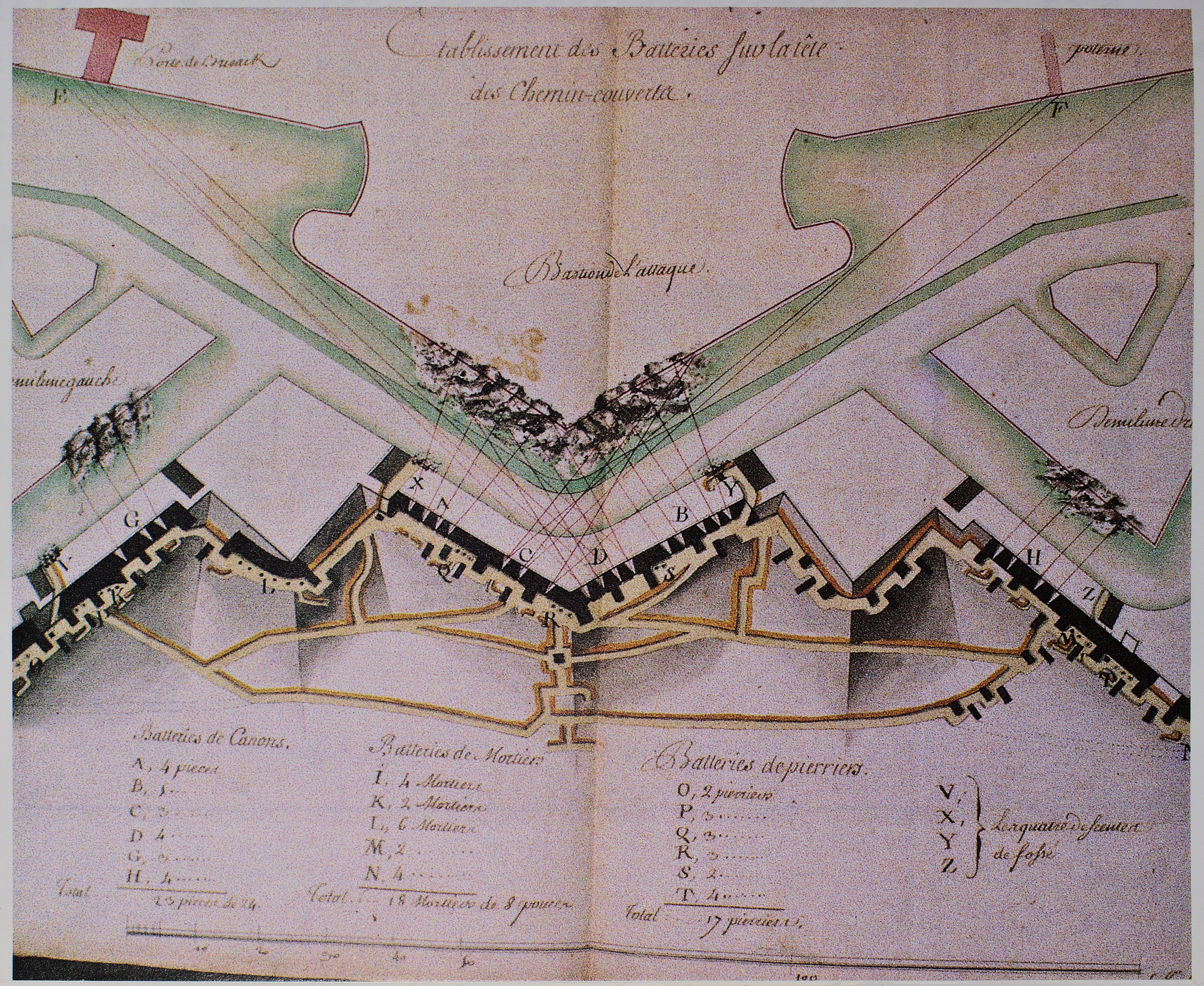
Installation of batteries above the covered ways 1744

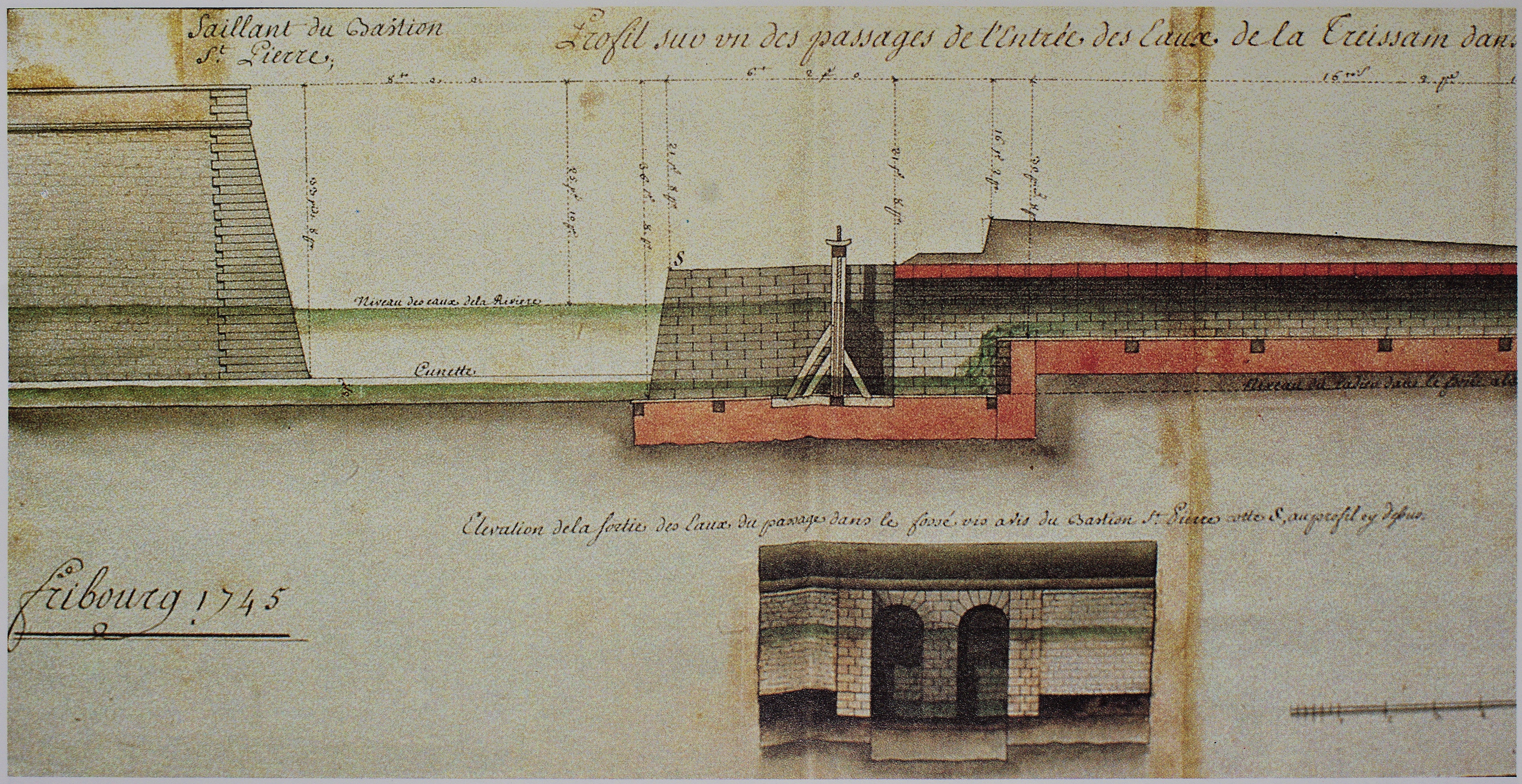
Cross-section of the Bastion St. Pierre on the top of the Schlossberg 1745

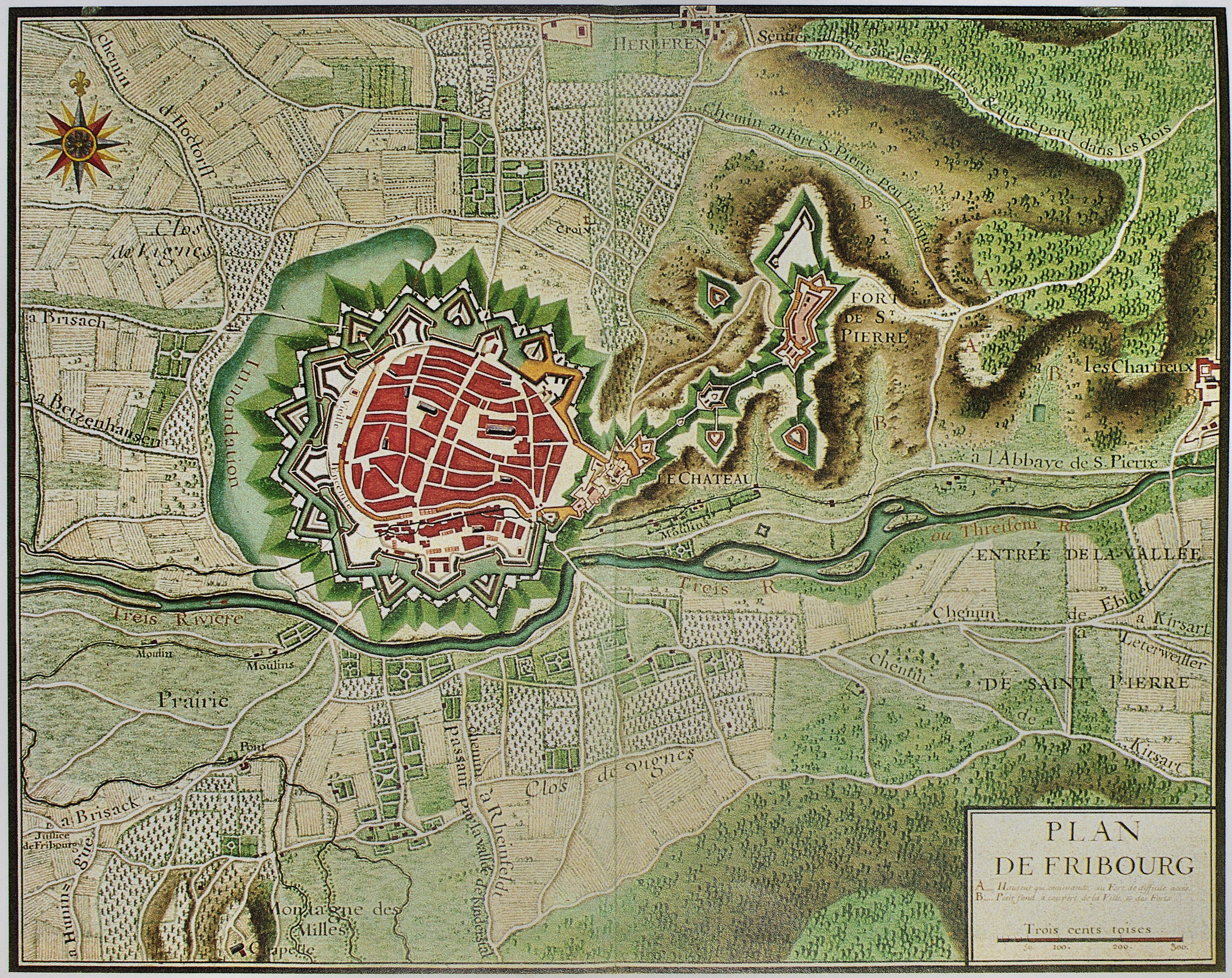
Historic map of Freiburg and surroundings in the national library of France in Paris

== Today ==
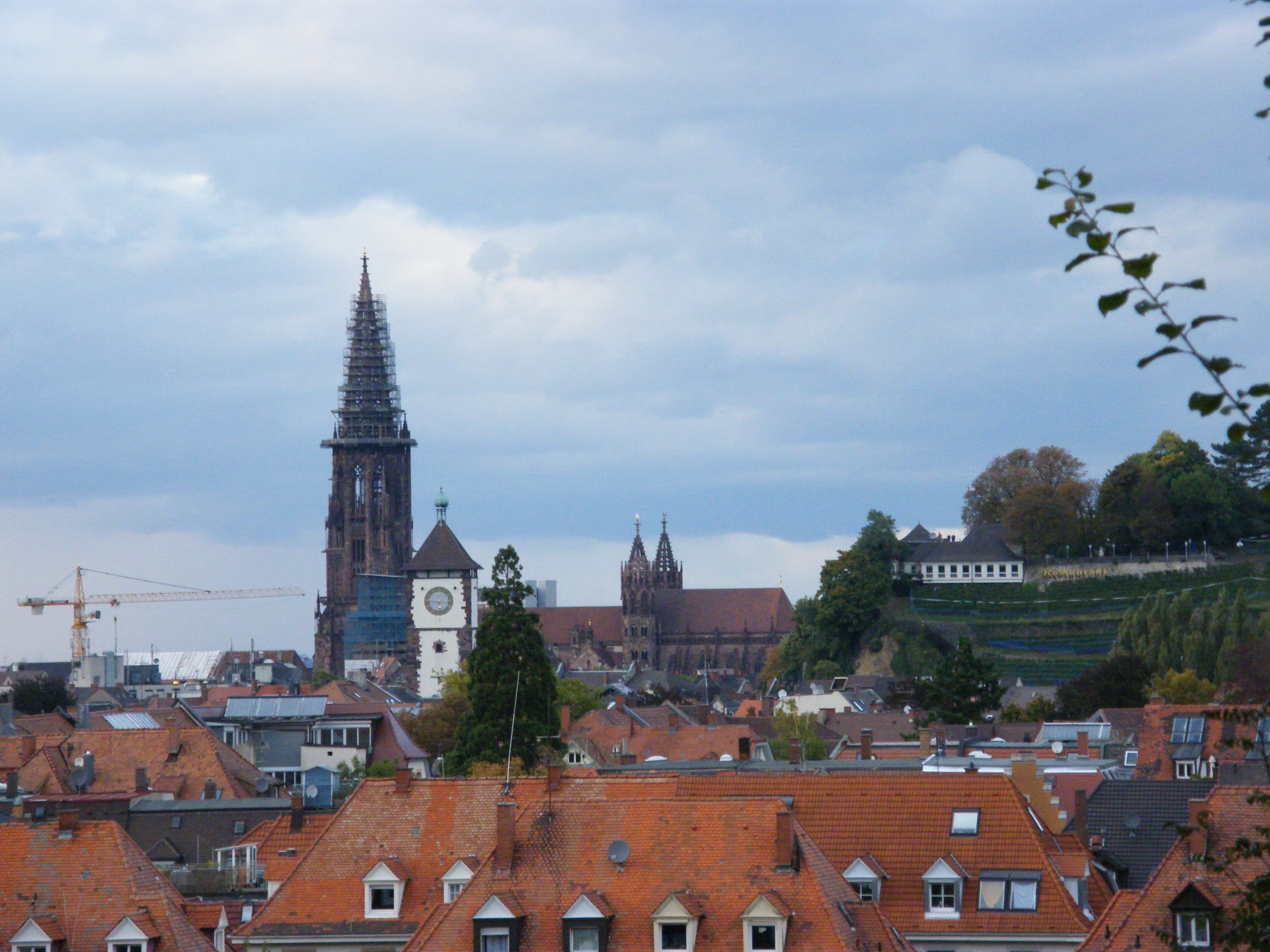
Schlossberg on the right.

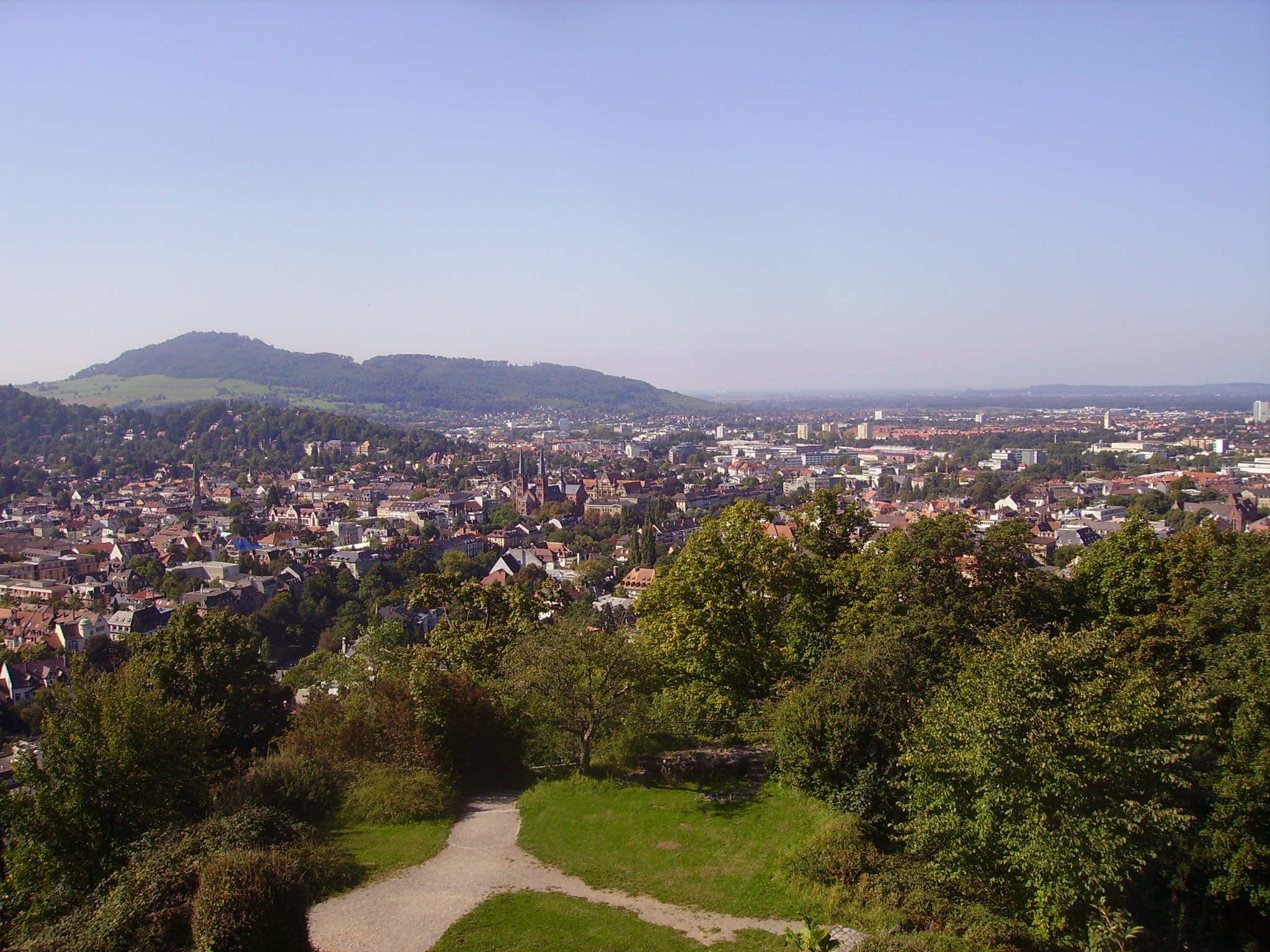
View from the Schlossberg.

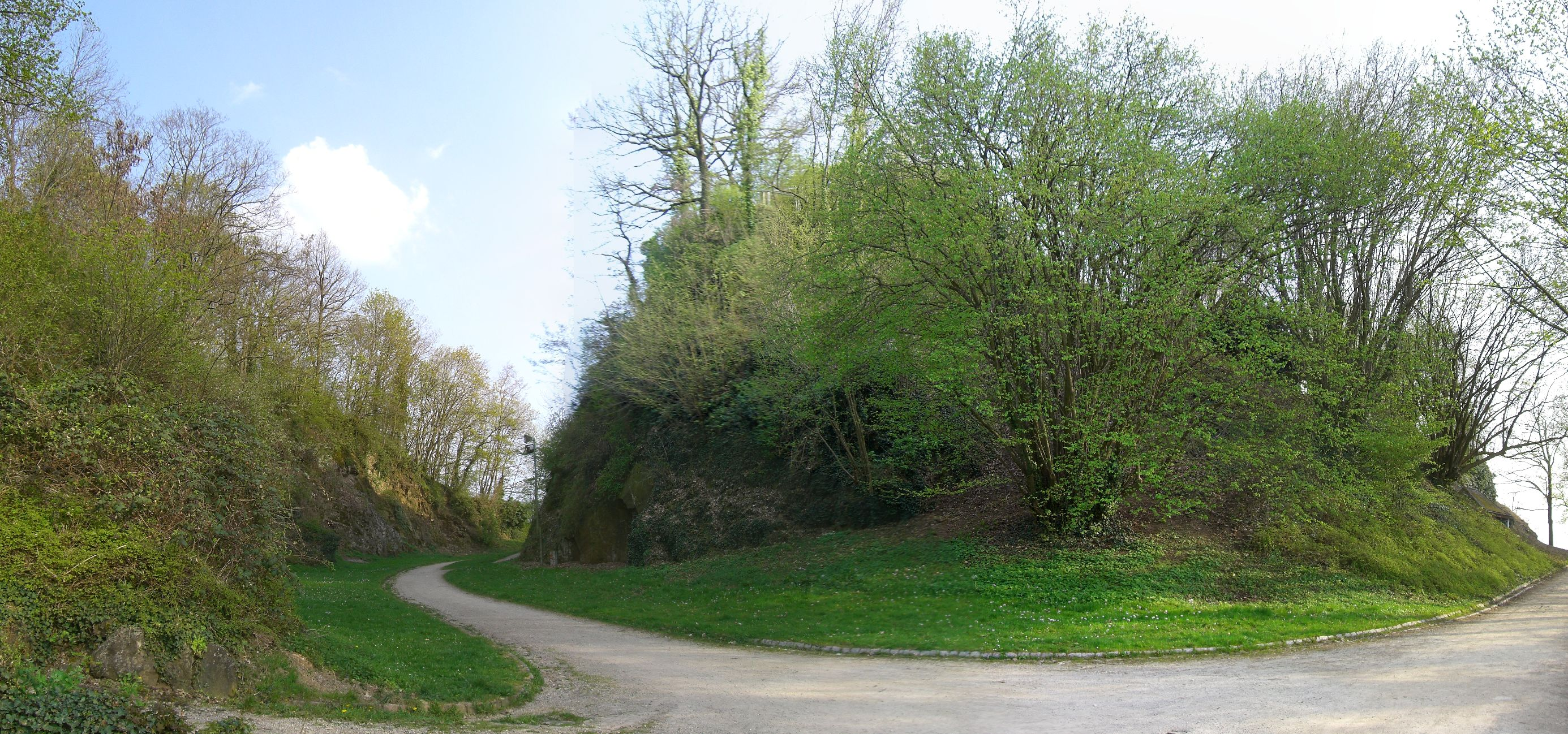
Ludwigshöhe (to its left the neck ditch).

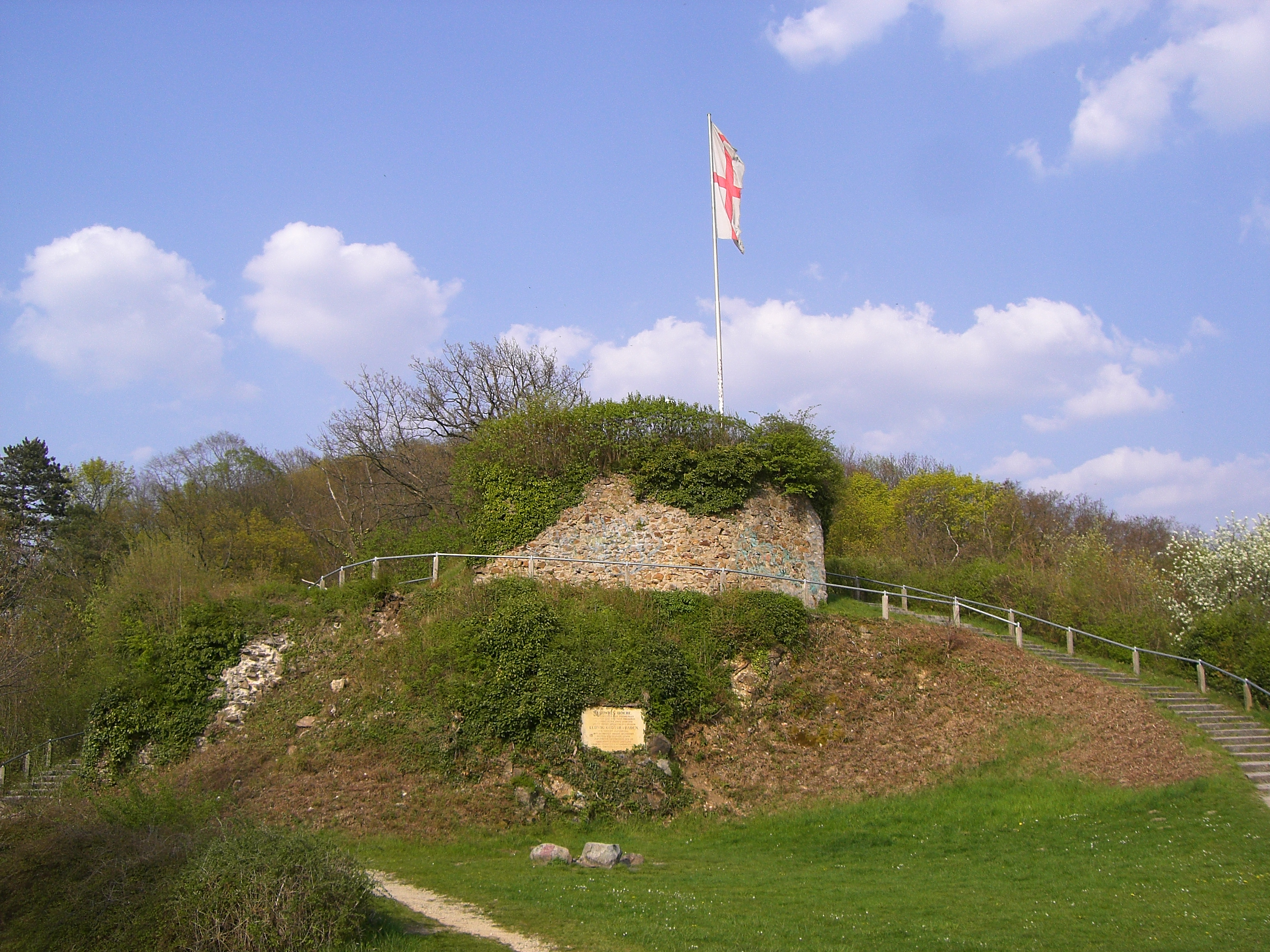
Ludwigshöhe. Its top is a good viewpoint.

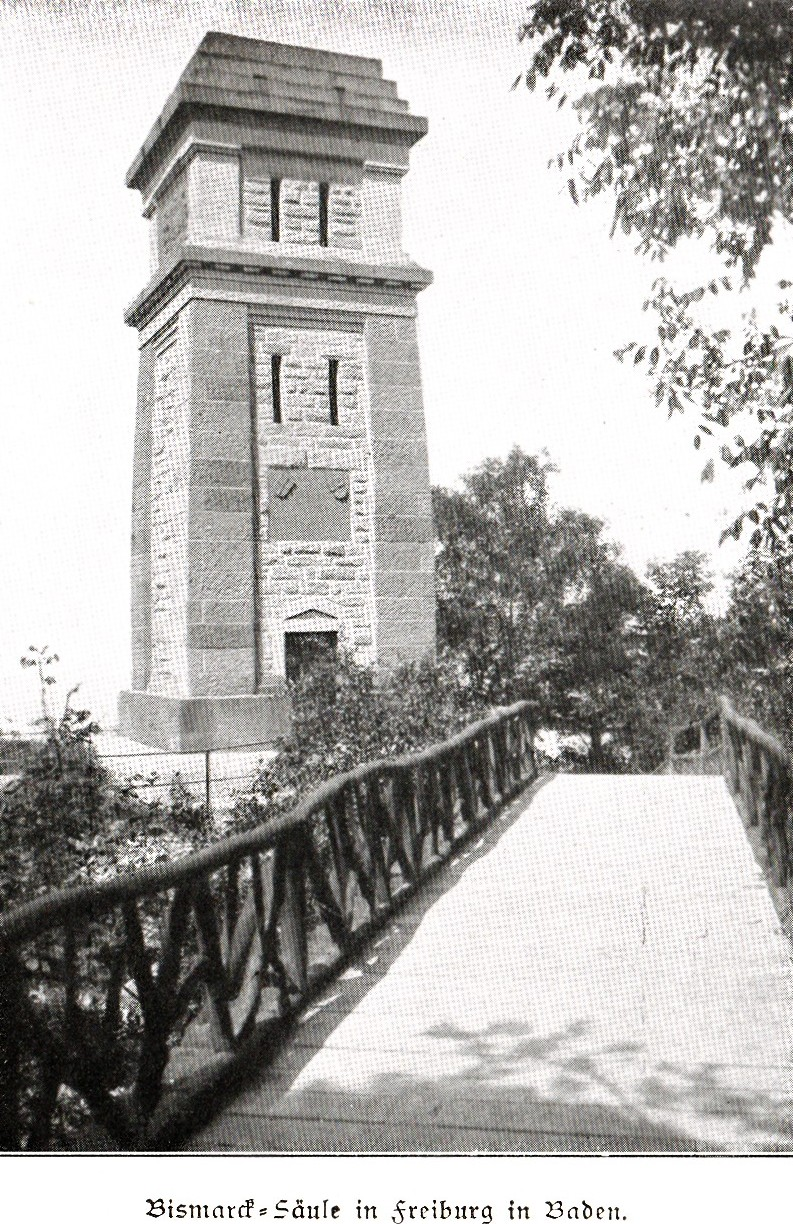
Freiburg Bismarckdenkmal 1915.

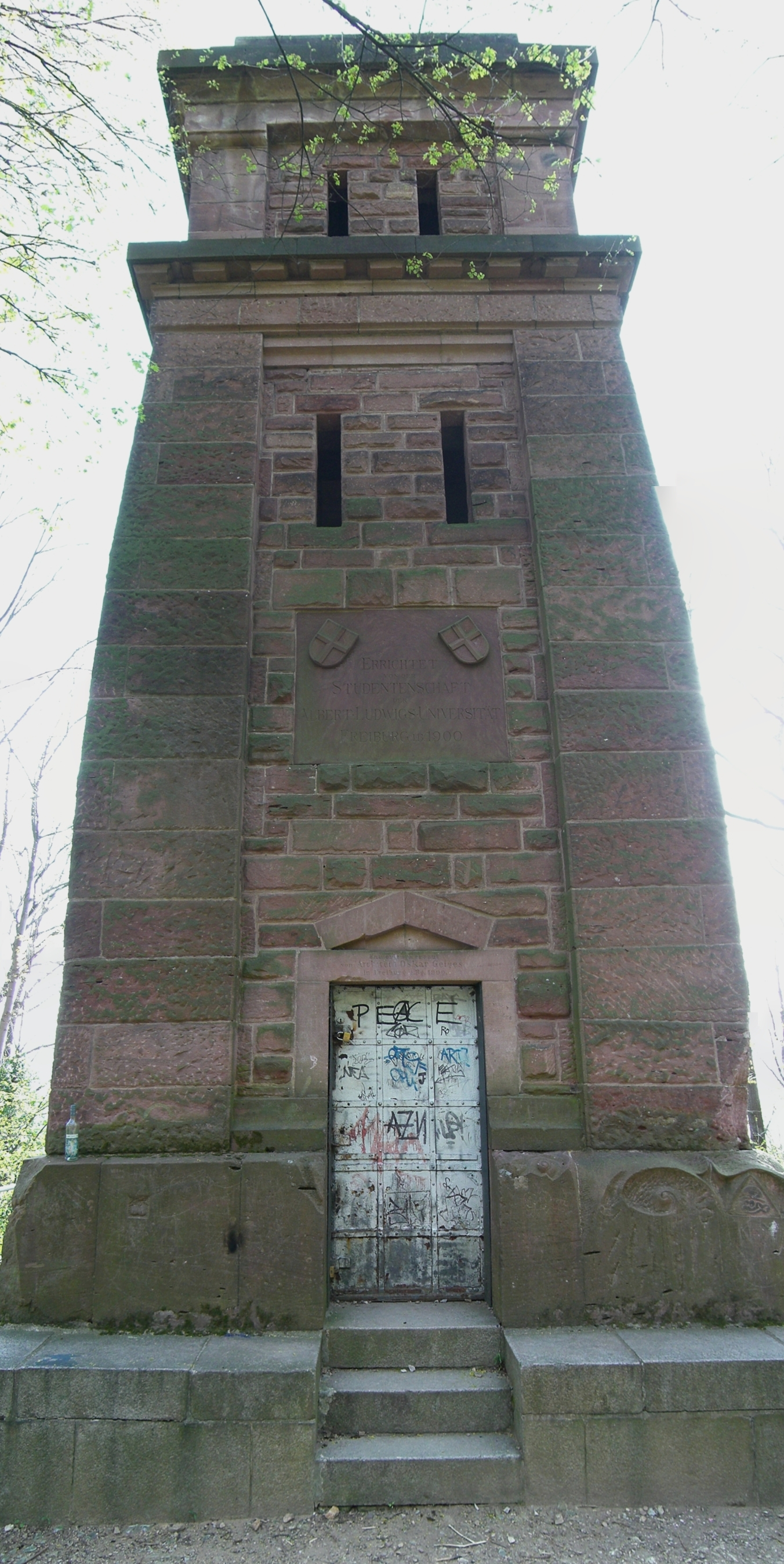
The Bismarck tower on the Schlossberg, built 1900.

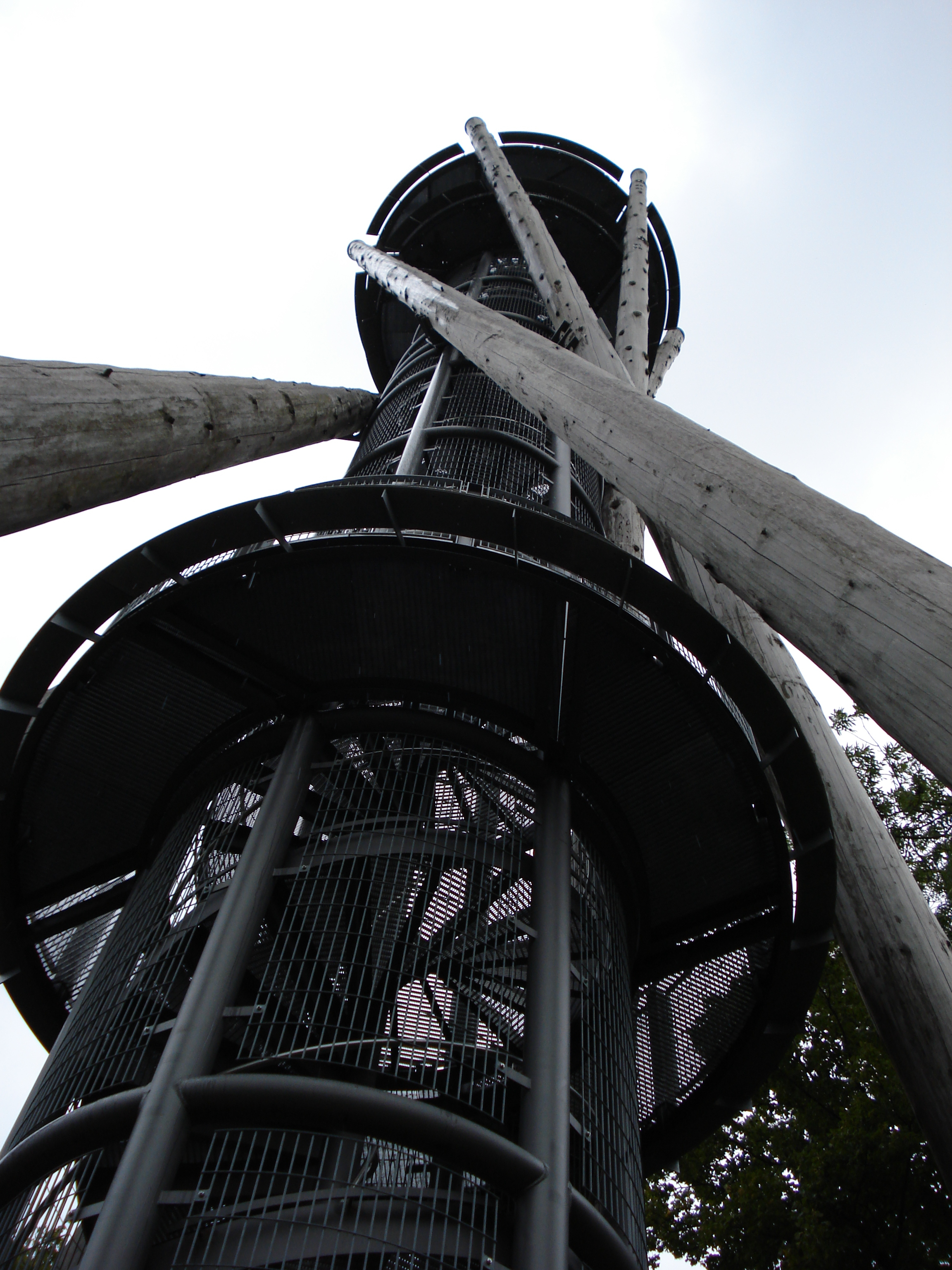
Schlossberg tower, built 2002.

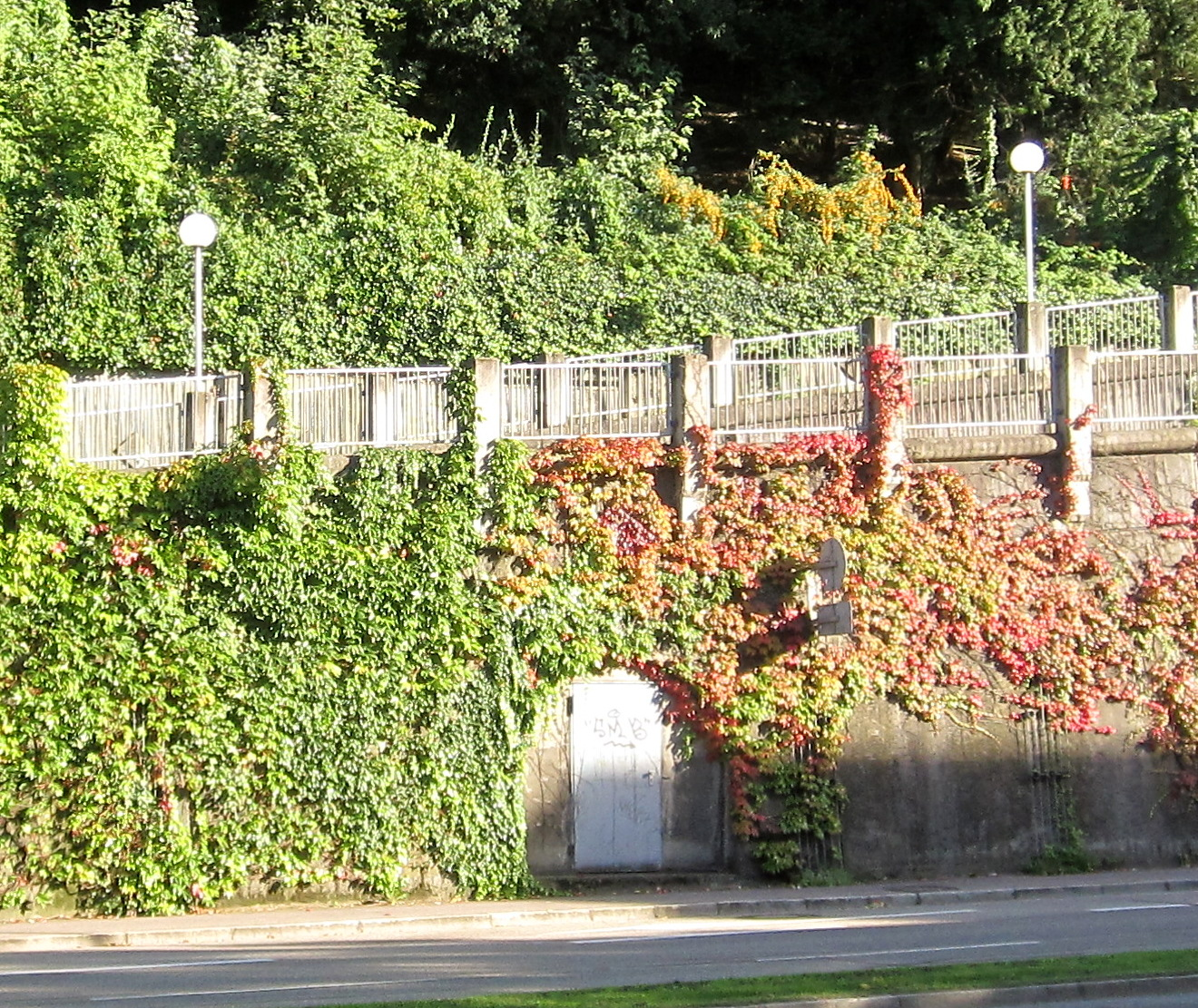
Entrance to the shelter at the bottom of the Schlossberg.

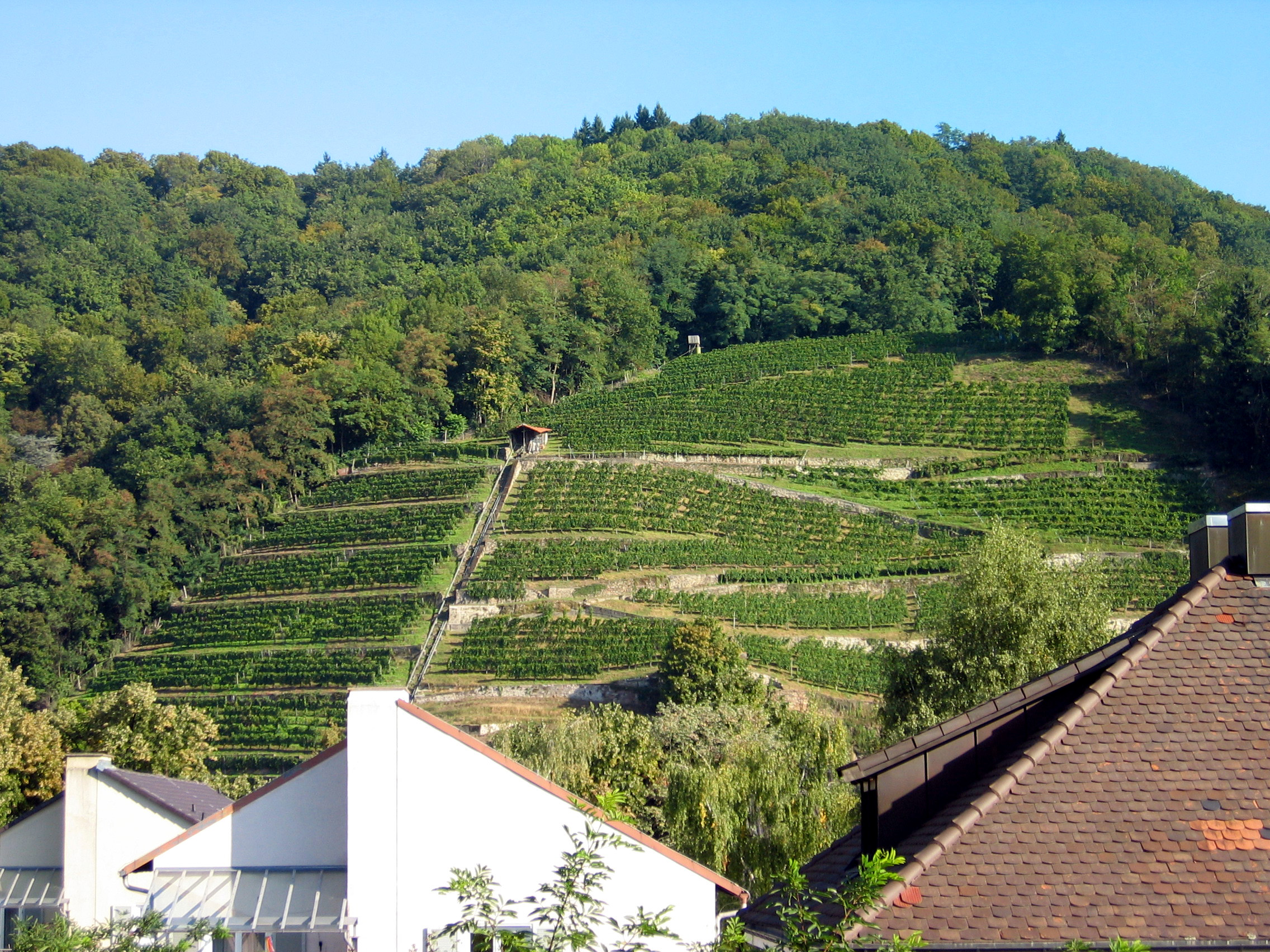
Vineyard on the slope of the Schlossberg,
