= Zähringen Castle =

Ruin in Baden-Württemberg, Germany

Zähringen castle
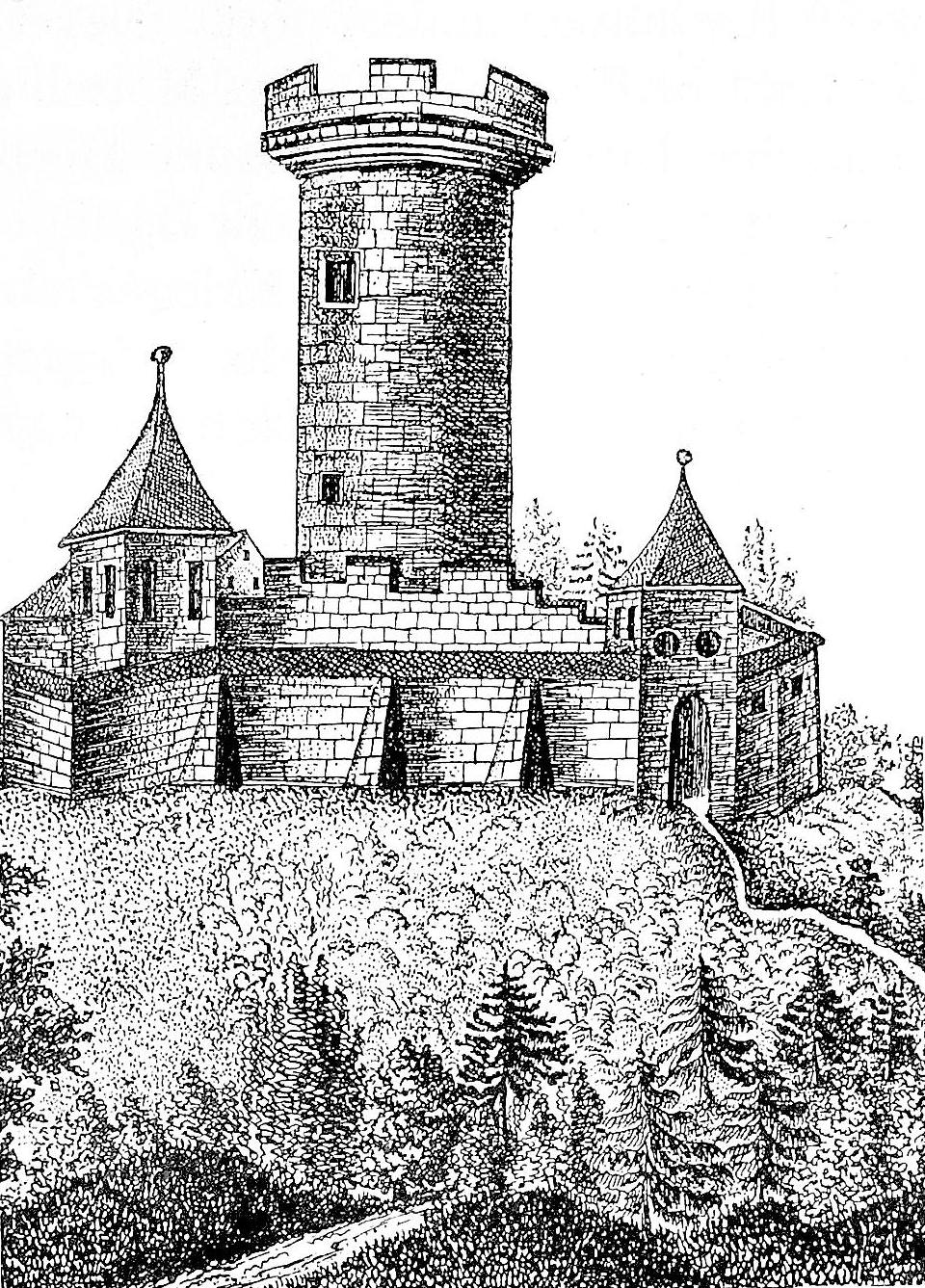
- Zähringen castle around 1500

Highest point
- Elevation: 478 m (1,568 ft)
- Coordinates: 48°1′31″N 7°53′3″E

Naming
- Language of name: German

Geography
- Location within Baden-Württemberg Location within Germany
- Location: Baden-Württemberg, Germany
- Parent range: Black Forest

The ruins of Zähringen castle is what remains of the ancestral seat of the Zähringer Alemannic noble family, located near Freiburg im Breisgau.

The Zähringer became a powerful ducal dynasty in the area of what is now South Germany and Switzerland in the high medieval period and the founder of several cities, including Freiburg im Breisgau, Villingen, Neuenburg, Freiburg im Üechtland, Bern, Thun, Rheinfelden and Murten.

The name Zähringen is mentioned for the first time in records dating back to the early 11th century. However, it is not clear without ambiguity whether they refer already to a fortification on the hilltop or to the village, the present day suburb of Freiburg.

The first unambiguous mention of the castle is in the Rotulus Sanpetrinus, a parchment roll issued in the nearby abbey of St. Peter, dated to 1128. That document was written in Latin and contains the passage "apud castrum Zaringen" (castrum is the Latin word for castle).

The castle was the seat of Berthold II of Zähringen until 1091, when he moved out of this castle to Freiburg Castle on the Schlossberg of Freiburg. He had ordered the construction of that new castle, because he considered that location to be more advantageous both from commercial and strategic perspectives.

The castle was besieged and taken in the context of the feud between Welf VI and Conrad III by the young Frederick Barbarossa in 1146.

After the House of Zähringen died out in 1218, Emperor Frederick II confiscated Zähringen castle as imperial fief.

Later, between 1275 and 1281, in the wake of controversies between the emperor and the counts of Urach regarding territorial possessions, the castle was destroyed and rebuilt. In 1422 the Margrave of Baden acquired a part of the compound. The castle was definitively destroyed during the German Peasants' War in 1525.

In 1815, the castle hill became the property of the house of Baden and today the area belongs to the municipality of Gundelfingen-Wildtal. What is still intact is a large round tower that was built in the 13th century. It has an observation deck that is surrounded by merlons. On the castle hill there is also a restaurant which provides diners with a view of the valley. The area is accessible by car only from Zähringen following the Pochgasse.

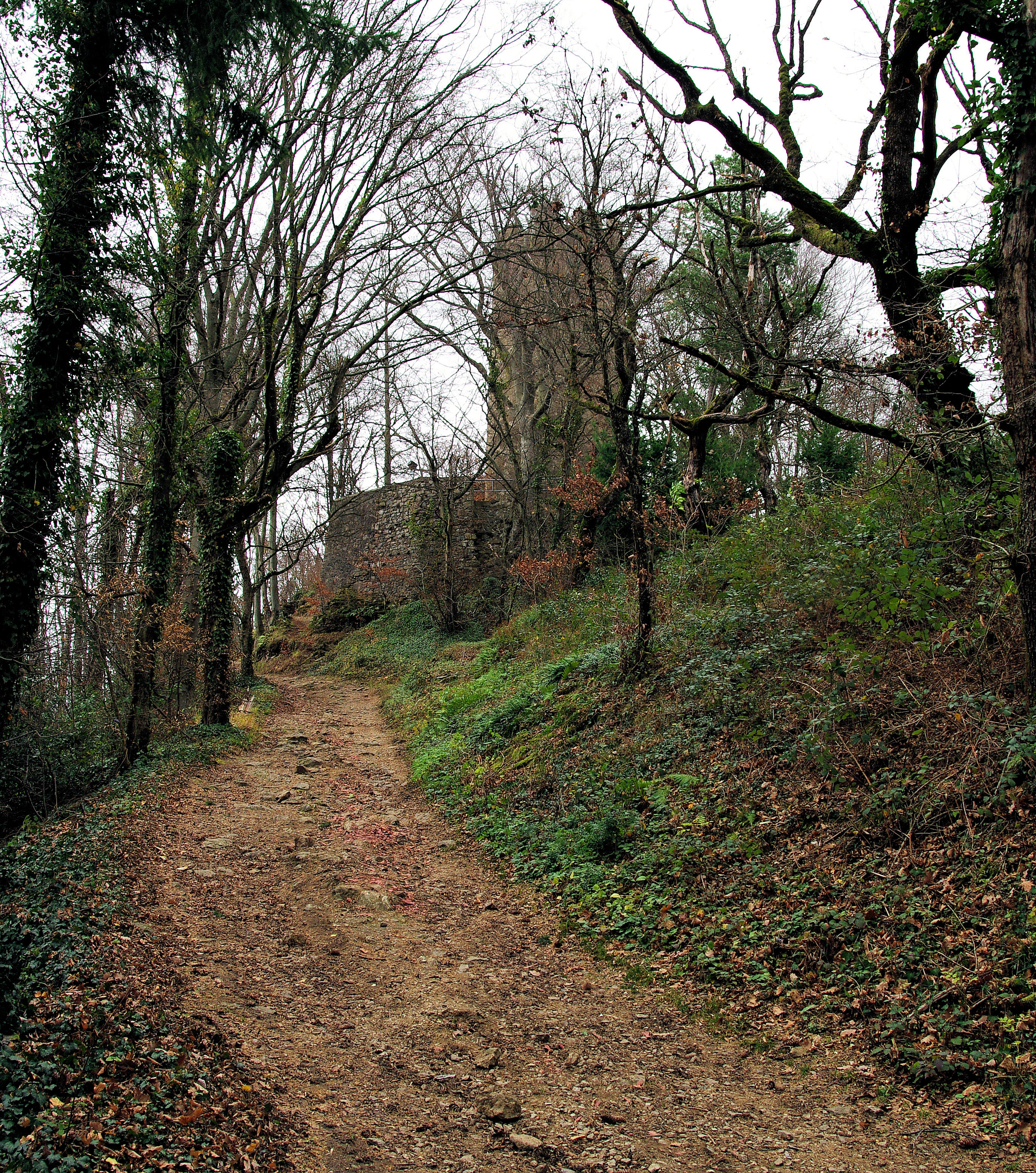
Approach

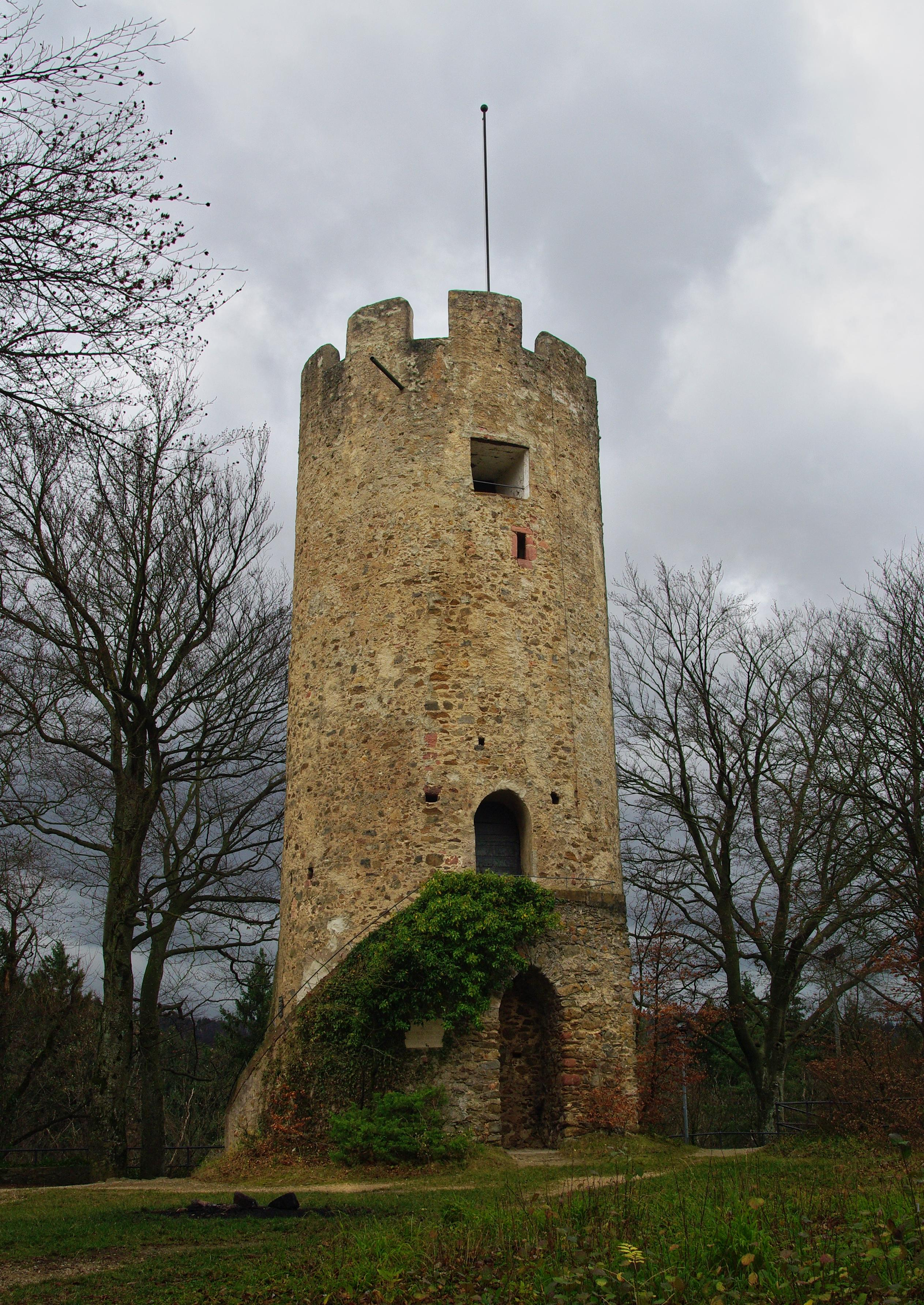
Front

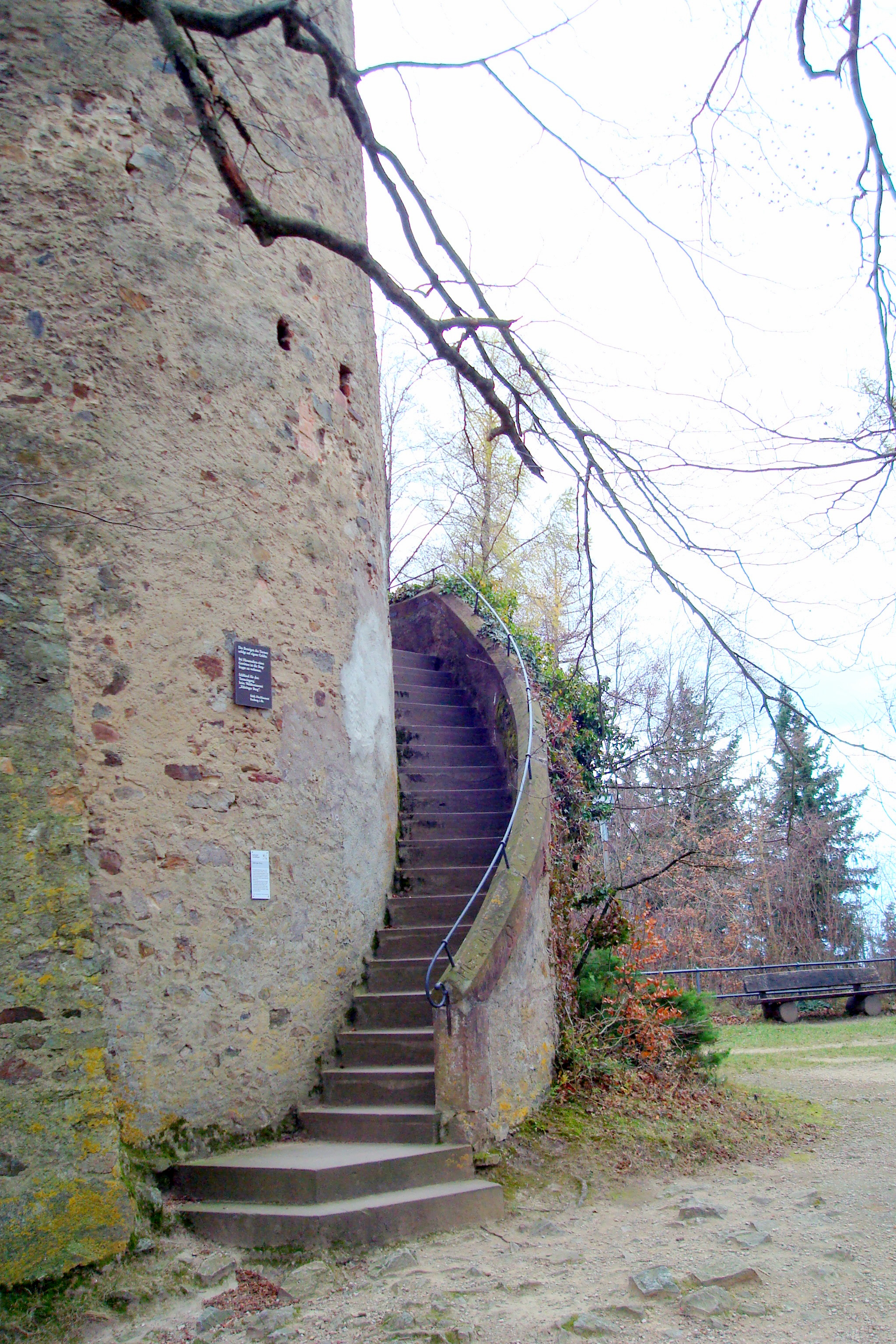
Entrance

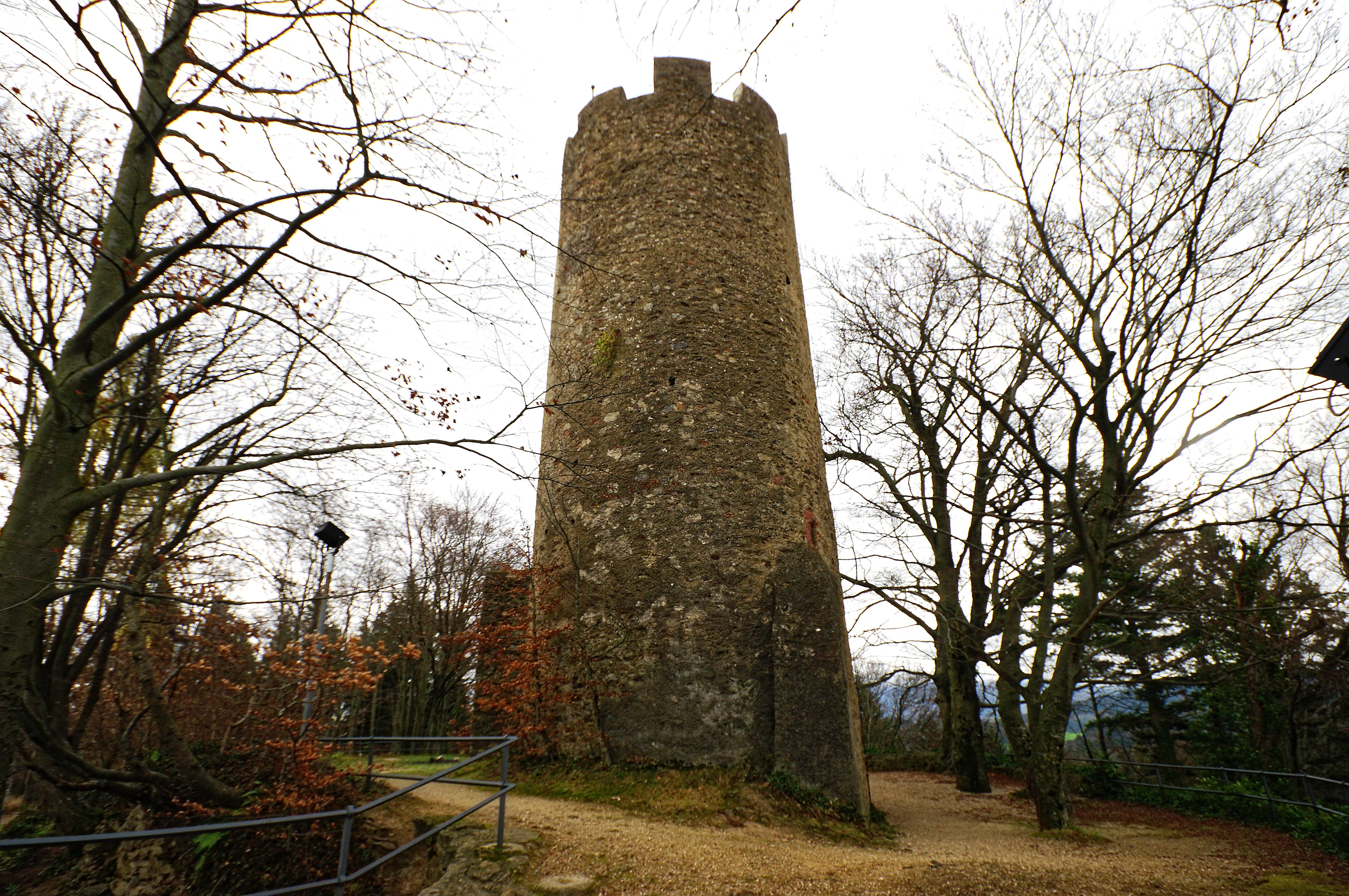
Rear
