= Aussichtsturm Schlossberg =

Observation tower in Freiburg im Breisgau

Coordinates: 47°59′42″N 7°51′43″E

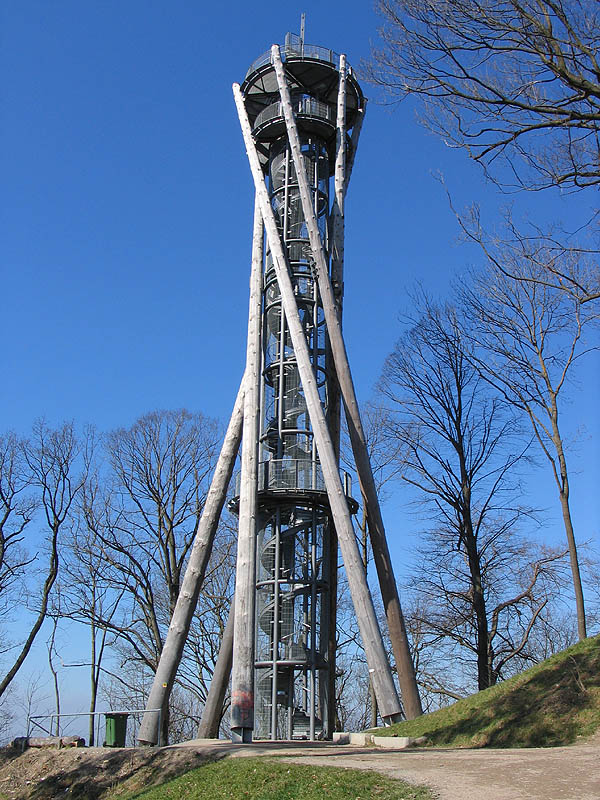
Observation Tower Castle Mountain

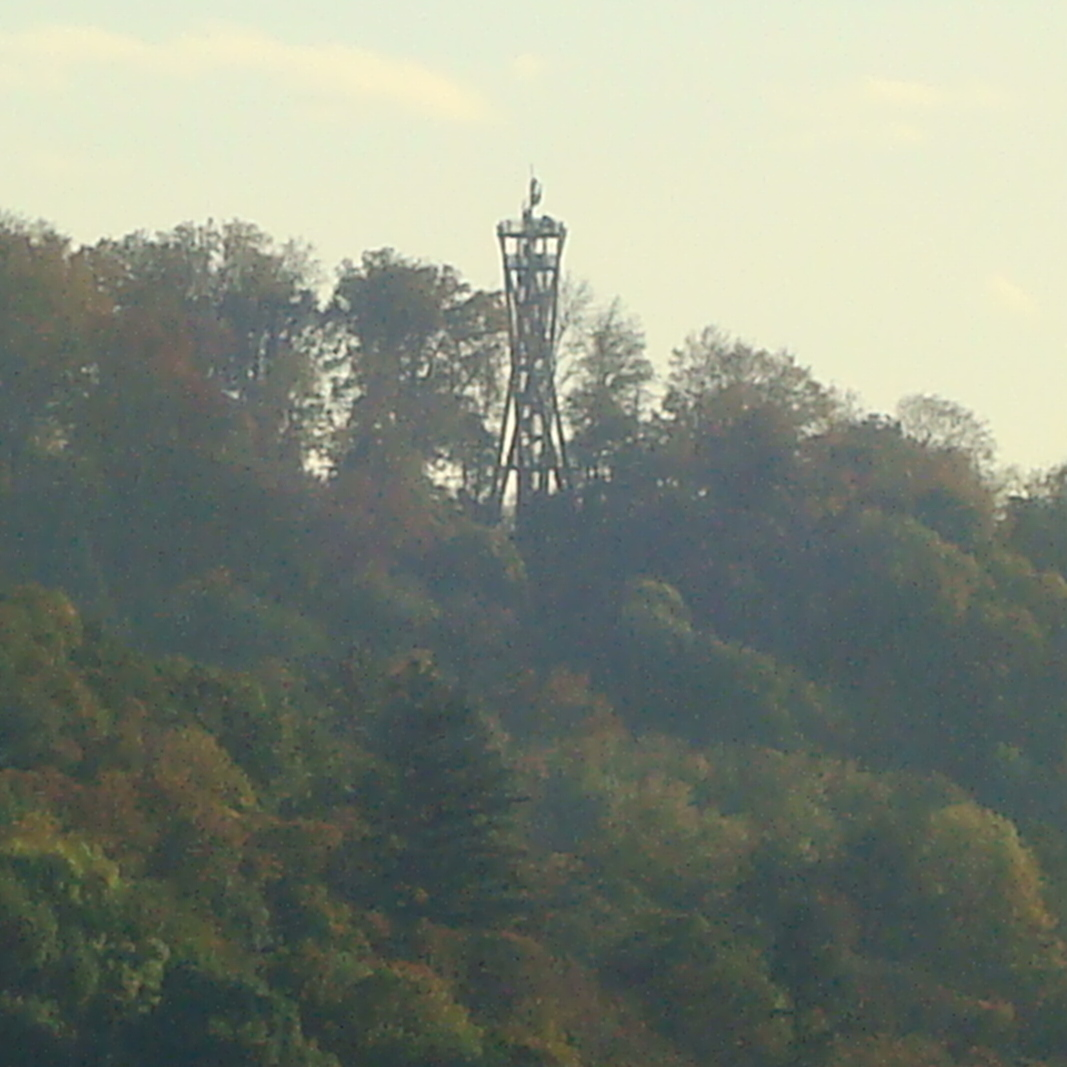
Castle Hill Tower seen from Eichhalde

The Schlossbergturm or Castle Hill Tower is a 35 m high observation tower on Castle Hill Schlossberg on the edge of the historic Altstadt of Freiburg im Breisgau. It has 153 steps, its top is located 463 m above sea level and thus 185 m above the average altitude of the city (278 m). The tower's twisted design includes six tree trunks (Douglas-firs from the municipal forest of Freiburg) around a staircase made of steel. It has three platforms and the top is reached by a small spiral staircase. The tower offers a panoramic view of Freiburg and its surroundings.

The tower is built on the grounds of the Fort de l'Aigle von Auban, also known locally as "Salzbüchsle", which are a continuation of the Black Forest into the city of Freiburg. It was designed by local Freiburg architect Hubert Horbach for the Kuratorium Freiburger Schlossberg, and built in 2002.

It was funded in part by donations. For each donor a plaque with his or her name was attached to the vertical part of a step so that when climbing the tower one can read the names of the donors.

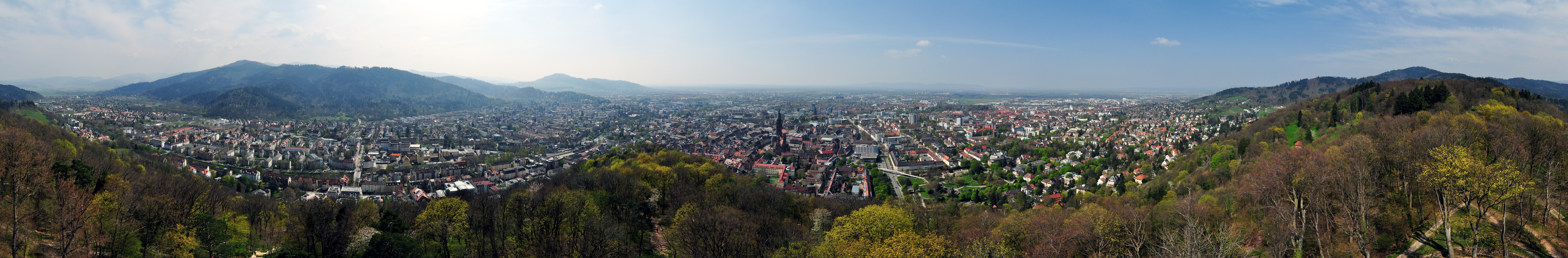
180°-Panorama of Freiburg im Breisgau taken from Schlossbergturm
