= Schlossberg (Freiburg) =

Mountain near Freiburg im Breisgau, Germany

Coordinates: 47.9942°N 7.85944°E

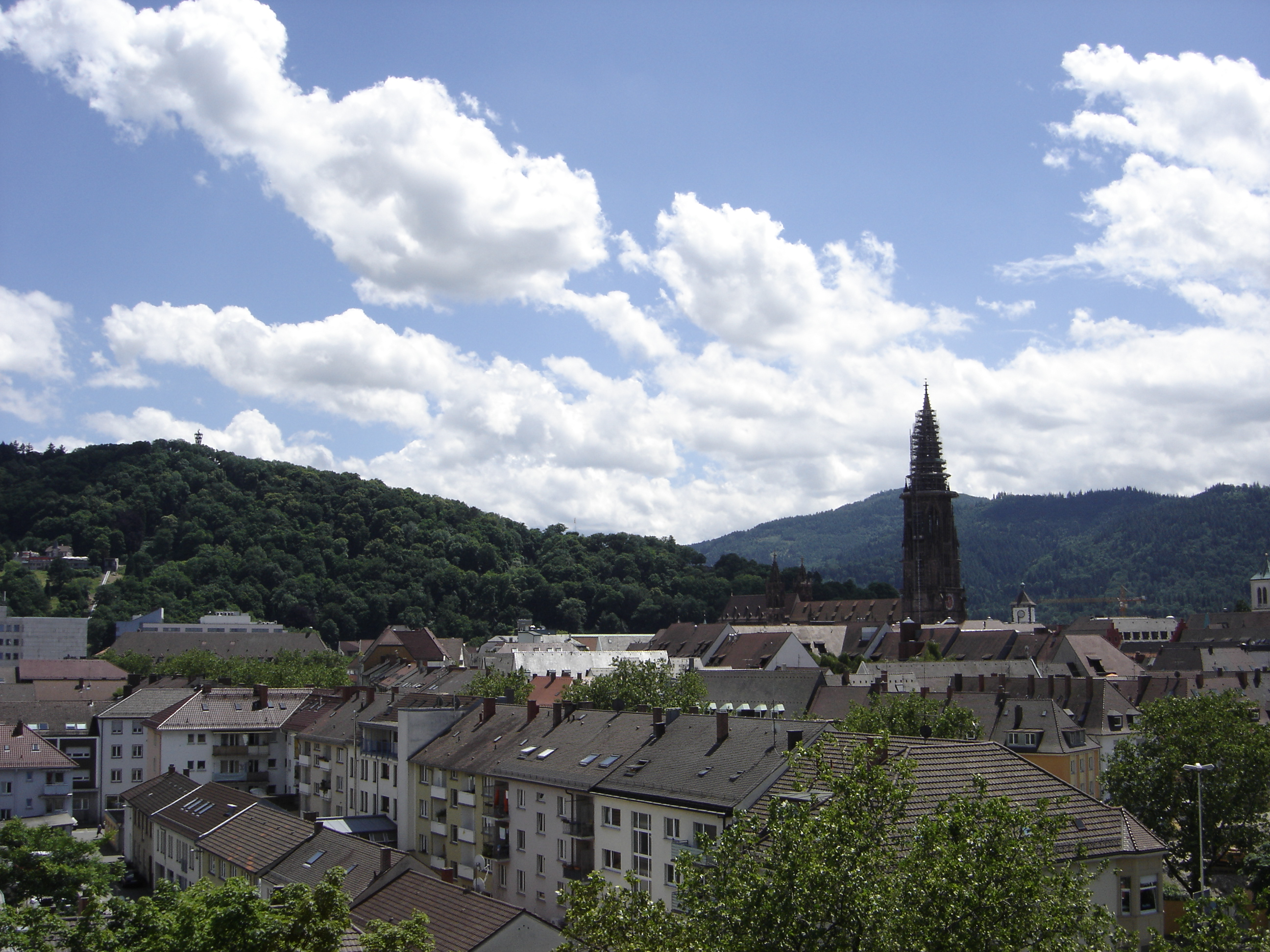
Freiburg - Blick vom Fahnenbergplatz auf Münster 1

The Schlossberg (German pronunciation: [ˈʃlɔsbɛʁk], "Castle Hill") is a tree-covered hill of 456 metres (1,496 ft) located in the area of the city of Freiburg im Breisgau. It is directly to the east of Freiburg's Old Town and is part of the Black Forest. The main geological fault is at the western edge of the Schlossberg, towards the Upper Rhine Graben.

== General information ==
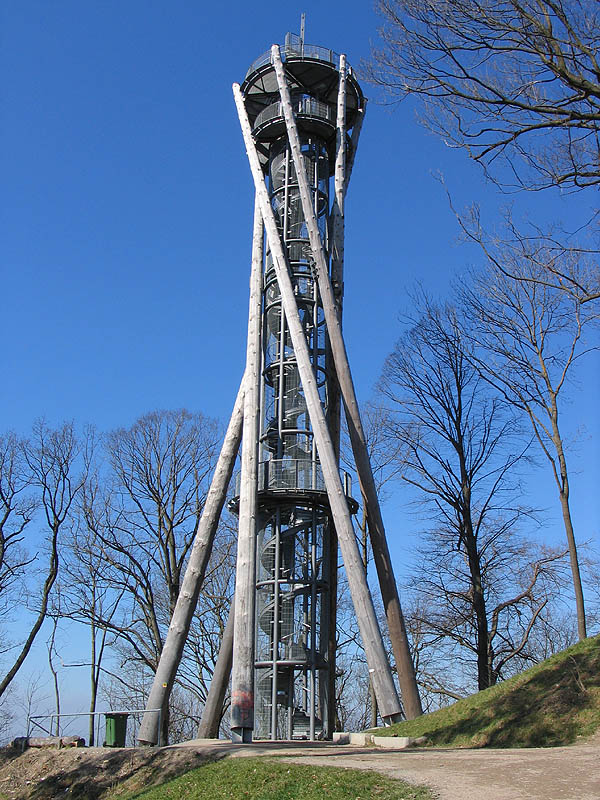
Schlossberg Tower

Fortified structures had been built on the Schlossberg since the 11th century. Remains of some of them are still visible today. For a few years now, the board of trustees has tried to make the historical past of the Schlossberg in Freiburg more visible. To achieve this, the remains of the old, overgrown fortifications are being carefully uncovered to make them available to interested visitors. The tower located on the hill (Schloßbergturm) offers a unique panoramic view over the whole town and its vicinity, and was built in 2002 as a project of the board of trustees.

The Burghaldering (literally the Motte ring) also offers a good view over the city, especially from the Kanonenplatz right above the historical centre. The Burghaldering, which circles the hill at half height is partly a hiking trail and partly a forest road closed to motor traffic. It can be reached by foot or car and, since July 2008, also via the new Schlossbergbahn, a funicular railway built to replace the old Schlossberg cable railway.

Inside the mountain, there is a water tower built between 1874 and 1876 to supply Freiburg. Alongside the water tank a large bomb shelter can be found, which was built in the 20th century. Its main entrance is located on the west side of the mountain. The Bismarcktower, made of red sandstone, is located on a rock above the Burghaldering. It was designed by Fritz Geiges and inaugurated in 1900.

== History ==
As far back as 1091, Berthold II, Duke of Zähringen, built the Romanesque-style Castum de Friburch, mentioned in numerous documents and praised in the songs of the medieval poet Hartmann von Aue. It was not until thirty years later in 1120 that his son Konrad, with the permission of Emperor Heinrich IV, bestowed the right to hold a market upon the settlement of artisans and servants which had grown up at the foot of the hill. This marked the end of the founding period of the city of Freiburg.

Over the centuries the fortifications on the Schlossberg were repeatedly destroyed by fire and hostilities, but were always re-erected by the rulers of the time because of their strategic importance in controlling the Dreisam River valley. While the Zähringer castle located to the north of the city was named after the village below it, the building on the Schlossberg was always referred to as the “Burghaldenschloss” or “fortified hilltop castle”.

The citizens of Freiburg took the fortress twice. In 1299 during the struggle with their overlord Count Egino II and his brother-in-law Konrad von Lichtenberg, the Bishop of Strasbourg, the citizens used a catapult to breach castle walls. And in 1366 in a siege during the conflict with Egino II the citizens in fact used cannons to raze “the most glorious fortress in German territories” to the ground. That put paid to any chances of an amicable relationship between the counts of Freiburg and the citizenry. In the end the people of the city bought their freedom for the price of 15,000 marks in silver, and placed themselves under the protection of the House of Habsburg in 1368. The new lord of the town, Archduke Leopold, generously gifted the ruins on the Schlossberg to the citizens.

The town carried out only minimal repairs on the fortification and thus it became easy prey for enemies during the Peasants' Revolt in 1525 and the Thirty Years' War (1618-1648). Finally, however, in 1668 Emperor Leopold I built a strong hilltop fortress called the Leopoldburg, incorporating the Burghaldenschloss. It was intended as a bulwark against the threat of Louis XIV to the Breisgau area. These efforts were in vain, however, for only nine years later in the Franco-Dutch Wars French troops conquered both the town and the fortress. After the Habsburgs were forced to relinquish Freiburg to the French in the Treaty of Nijmegen in 1679, the Schlossberg underwent its greatest alterations. Louis XIV instructed his fortifications engineer Sébastien Le Prestre de Vauban to establish the city of Freiburg as a French outpost within Further Austria; the entire city including the Schlossberg was to be surrounded by a modern, tiered fortification wall. In 1681 the king himself came with a large entourage to inspect the construction work, and on this occasion he also visited the Schlossberg.

After the Nine Years War came to an end with the Treaty of Ryswick, Louis XIV had to give up Freiburg. This loss for the French realm was given a positive colouring, as can be seen in the following French record:

The King has abandoned a number of places which were of no strategic use ...the city of Freiburg was not of sufficient use for the King to feel its return as a loss. The city has returned to the fold of the Holy Roman Empire and the protection of the Emperor, who is at the same time the lord of the land.

During the War of the Spanish Succession, in 1713, the fortress, manned by a strong Austrian force, was once again besieged and taken by French troops under the command of Marshall Claude Louis Hector de Villars. The restitution of the fortress to the Holy Roman Empire was negotiated in Rastatt and implemented in 1715.

And yet again there was a war – this time the Austrian War of Succession. In the autumn of 1744, as allies of Frederick the Great of Prussia, the French once again took Freiburg. Louis XV himself observed how the siege of the city was progressing from the vantage point of the Lorettoberg (Loretto Hill) and was almost hit by a stray cannonball fired by the forces defending the city. One year later Freiburg was returned to the Habsburgs, in the Treaty of Dresden. Before the French troops departed, however, they destroyed Vauban’s system of ramparts so thoroughly that for several decades a vast field of rubble spread over the Schlossberg and the surrounding area of the town.

It was on the overgrown rubble of a lower outcrop of the Schlossberg that the Austrian district president, Hermann von Greiffenegg, had a residence built in 1805. It was referred to as “Greiffeneggschlössle” (Greiffenegg’s little castle) by the locals. Von Greiffenegg himself named it Quieti Sacrum (Sacred Stillness) and lived in it for only two years up to his death. His son, who led an unsettled life, lived in it from 1833 to 1840 before he was forced to sell it for financial reasons. Today it houses a restaurant with a very charming beer-garden under chestnut trees.
