= Freiburg II (electoral district) =

State electoral district of Germany

47: Freiburg II
- Electoral district for the Landtag of Baden-Württemberg
- Freiburg II in 2026
- District: Freiburg, Breisgau-Hochschwarzwald, and Waldshut
- Electorate: 130,343 (2026)
- Major settlements: Freiburg (partial), Betzenhausen, Brühl, Haslach, Hochdorf, Landwasser, Lehen, Mooswald, Munzingen, Opfingen, Rieselfeld, Sankt Georgen, Stühlinger, Tiengen, Wiehre, Vauban, Waltershofen, Weingarten, and Zähringen

Current electoral district
- Party: Green
- Member: Nadyne Saint-Cast

Freiburg II is an electoral constituency (German: Wahlkreis) represented in the Landtag of Baden-Württemberg. Since 2026, it has elected one member via first-past-the-post voting. Voters cast a second vote under which additional seats are allocated proportionally state-wide. Under the constituency numbering system, it is designated as constituency 47. It is split between the city of Freiburg, and the districts of Breisgau-Hochschwarzwald and Waldshut.

== Geography ==
The constituency consists of:

- The city districts of Altstadt, Ebnet, Günterstal, Herdern, Kappel, Littenweiler, Mittelwiehre, Neuburg, Oberau, Oberwiehre, and Waldsee, within the city Freiburg.
- The municipalities of Betzenhausen, Brühl, Haslach, Hochdorf, Landwasser, Lehen, Mooswald, Munzingen, Opfingen, Rieselfeld, Sankt Georgen, Stühlinger, Tiengen, Wiehre, Vauban, Waltershofen, Weingarten, and Zähringen, within the district of Breisgau-Hochschwarzwald.

There were 130,343 eligible voters in 2026.

== Members ==
=== First mandate ===
Both prior to and since the electoral reforms for the 2026 election, the winner of the plurality of the vote (first-past-the-post) in every constituency won the first mandate.

| Election | Member | Party | % |
|---|---|---|---|
| 1976 | Conrad Schroeder | CDU | |
| 1980 | Günter Schrempp | SPD | |
| 1984 | Günter Schrempp | SPD | |
| 1988 | Günter Schrempp | SPD | |
| 1992 | Günter Schrempp | SPD | |
| 1996 | Ursula Kuri | CDU | |
| 2001 | Margot Queitsch | SPD | 36.7 |
| 2006 | Bernhard Schätzle | CDU | 30.8 |
| 2011 | Edith Sitzmann | Grüne | 39.9 |
| 2016 | Edith Sitzmann | Grüne | 40.5 |
| 2021 | Nadyne Saint-Cast | Grüne | 40.3 |
| 2026 | Nadyne Saint-Cast | Grüne | 37.8 |

=== Second mandate ===
Prior to the electoral reforms for the 2026 election, the seats in the state parliament were allocated proportionately amongst parties which received more than 5% of valid votes across the state. The seats that were won proportionally for parties that did not win as many first mandates as seats they were entitled to, were allocated to their candidates which received the highest proportion of the vote in their respective constituencies. This meant that following some elections, a constituency would have one or more members elected under a second mandate.

Prior to 2011, these second mandates were allocated to the party candidates who got the greatest number of votes, whilst from 2011-2021, these were allocated according to percentage share of the vote.

| Election | Member | Party | Member | Party |
|---|---|---|---|---|
| 1976 | Rudolf Schieler | SPD | | |
| 1980 | | | Helgo Bran | Grüne |
| 1984 | | | Thilo Weichert | Grüne |
| Jun 1986 | | | Klaus-Dieter Käser | Grüne |
| 1988 | | | Rosemarie Glaser | Grüne |
| 1992 | | | Dieter Salomon | Grüne |
| 1996 | | | Dieter Salomon | Grüne |
| 2001 | | | Dieter Salomon | Grüne |
| Aug 2002 | | | Edith Sitzmann | Grüne |
| 2006 | Margot Queitsch | SPD | Edith Sitzmann | Grüne |
| 2011 | Gabi Rolland | SPD | | |
| 2016 | Gabi Rolland | SPD | | |
| 2021 | Gabi Rolland | SPD | | |

== Election results ==
=== 2026 election ===
State election (2026): Freiburg II
| Notes: | Blue background denotes the winner of the electorate vote. Pink background denotes a candidate elected from their party list. Yellow background denotes an electorate win by a list member, or other incumbent. A ✓ or ✗ denotes status of any incumbent, win or lose respectively. | | | | | | |
| Party | Candidate | Votes | % | ±% | Party votes | % | ±% |
|---|---|---|---|---|---|---|---|
| Greens | ✓ Nadyne Saint-Cast | 34,258 | 37.8 | ▼2.5 | 40,566 | 44.7 | ▲4.3 |
| CDU | Katrin Kern | 18,104 | 20.0 | ▲6.7 | 15,653 | 17.2 | ▲4.0 |
| Left | Sarah Schnitzler | 14,976 | 16.5 | ▲5.4 | 12,146 | 13.4 | ▲2.2 |
| AfD | Karl Schwarz | 8,860 | 9.8 | ▲4.0 | 8,825 | 9.7 | ▲4.0 |
| SPD | Viviane Sigg | 8,198 | 9.0 | ▼3.6 | 5,247 | 5.8 | ▼6.9 |
| FDP | Linus Kionka | 1,958 | 2.2 | ▼3.8 | 2,471 | 2.7 | ▼3.2 |
| Volt | Niklas Gutheim | 1,609 | 1.8 | ▲0.7 | 1,159 | 1.3 | ▲0.2 |
| BSW | Rainer Büttner | 1,573 | 1.7 | | 1,337 | 1.5 | |
| FW | | | | | 983 | 1.1 | ▼1.8 |
| APT | | | | | 833 | 0.9 | |
| PARTEI | Oliver Beck | 1,09 | {{{percentage}}} | ▼0.9 | 478 | 0.5 | ▼1.6 |
| dieBasis | | | | | 283 | 0.3 | ▼0.9 |
| ÖDP | | | | | 162 | 0.2 | ▼0.5 |
| Bündnis C | | | | | 140 | 0.2 | ▼0.1 |
| Pensioners | | | | | 127 | 0.1 | |
| KlimalisteBW | | | | | 108 | 0.1 | ▼2.1 |
| Values | | | | | 86 | 0.1 | |
| PdF | | | | | 66 | 0.1 | |
| Verjüngungsforschung | | | | | 64 | 0.1 | |
| Team Todenhöfer | | | | | 61 | 0.1 | |
| Humanists | | | | | 55 | 0.1 | |
| Informal votes | | 605 | | | 390 | | |
| Total valid votes | | 90,635 | | | 90,850 | | |
| Turnout | | 91,240 | 70.0 | ▲5.5 | | | |
| Greens hold | Majority | 16,154 | 17.8 | | | | |

== See also ==
- Politics of Baden-Württemberg
- Landtag of Baden-Württemberg
