= SWFR =

SWFR may refer to the following topics:

- Stingray Swamp Flora Reserve, a nature reserve in New South Wales, Australia
- Studierendenwerk Freiburg, an organisation for assisting university students in and around Freiburg, Germany
