= Betzenhausen =

- Quarter of Freiburg
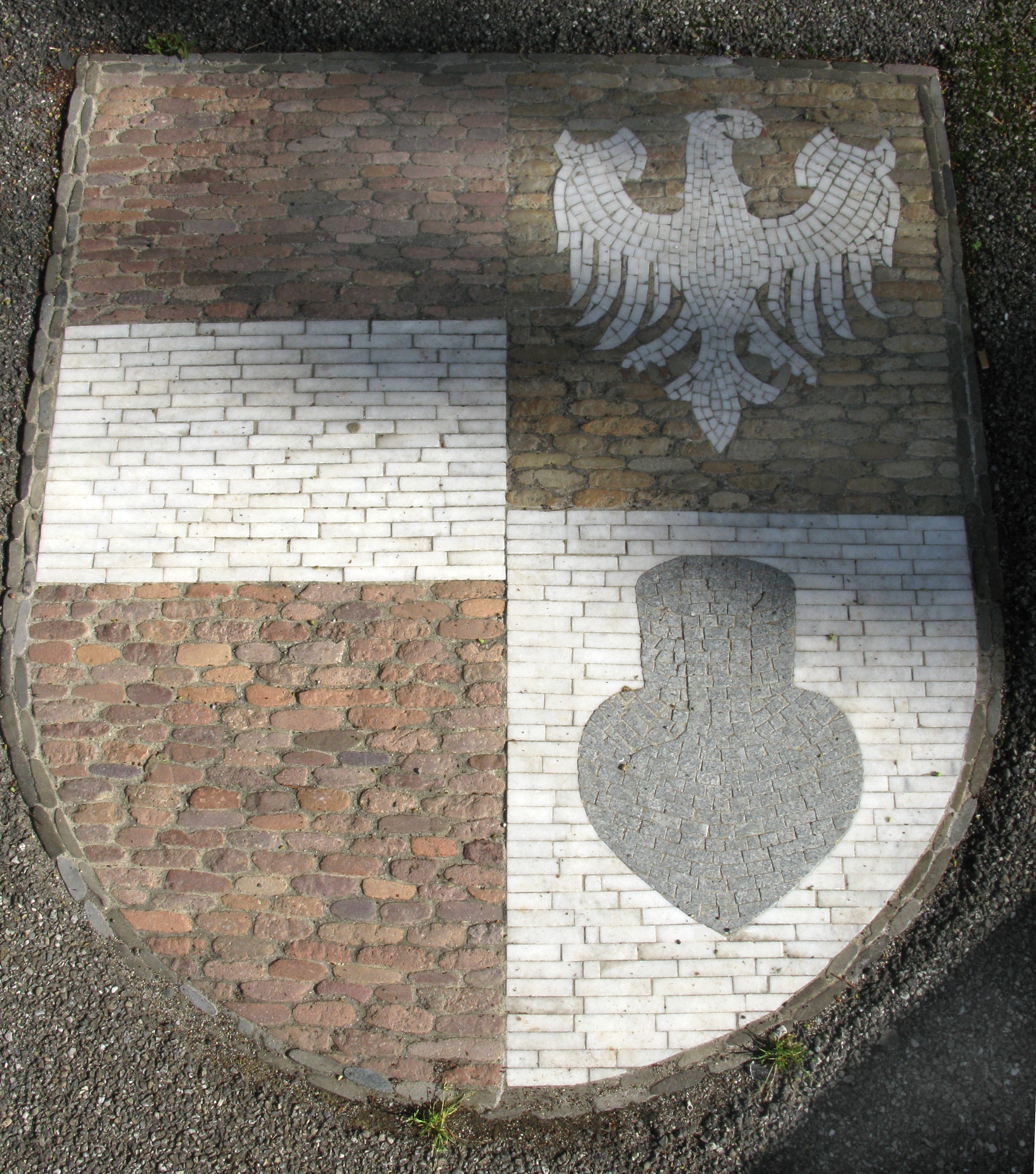

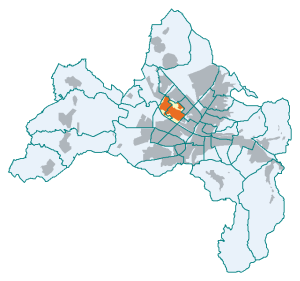
- Location of Betzenhausen in Freiburg
- Interactive map of Betzenhausen
- Location within Germany Location within Baden-Württemberg
- Coordinates: 48°0′30″N 7°49′0″E
- Country: Germany
- State: Baden-Württemberg
- District: Urban district
- City: Freiburg

Area
  - Total: 2.20 km^{2} (0.85 sq mi)
- Elevation: 250 m (820 ft)

Population (2020-12-31)
  - Total: 14,282
  - Density: 6,490/km^{2} (16,800/sq mi)
- Time zone: UTC+01:00 (CET)
  - Summer (DST): UTC+02:00 (CEST)
- Postal codes: 79110, 79114

Betzenhausen (German pronunciation: [bɛtsn̩ˈhaʊzn̩]) is a quarter in the west of Freiburg im Breisgau, Germany. It consists of the statistical districts Alt-Betzenhausen and Betzenhausen-Bischofslinde.

Neighbouring districts are Mooswald to the north, Stühlinger to the east, Weingarten to the south and Lehen to the west.

== History ==
Betzenhausen was first mentioned in a certificate by Otto I directed at Einsiedeln Abbey in 972. The small village belonged to the city of Freiburg for more than 400 years from 1381, before it became a sovereign community in 1807.

Soon it was time for change again, the community wanting to rejoin the city of Freiburg at the end of the 19th century, due to their poor financial state at the time. They proposed a series of requests towards the city, as conditions for the proposed new rejoinment. The community requested its own water pipe, its own school, a better street network and street lighting. The negotiations dragged out until 1907, when the city finally recognized that an additional district would allow the city to expand more easily towards the west (a total of 2.8 square kilometers). The district was officially incorporated on 1 January 1908.

The 1970s marked further development in the area of Bischofslinde, leading to a new center being established, incorporating the catholic church of St. Albert and the Anne-Frank school. A large student housing scheme was built to the north. The district received a further boost in 1986, when the "Landgartenschau" Baden-Württemberg was held in Freiburg, on a site around the Flückigersee. As a result, the Seepark was created, a large recreational area to this day.

== Infrastructure ==
Small gardens can be found to the south of the district, the aforementioned Seepark lies to the northwest, where the Hallenbad West also marks Freiburgs largest swimming pool. The district is home to student settlements, the largest being the Studentensiedlung (StuSie) and the Ulrich-Zasius-Haus, both belonging to the Studentenwerk Freiburg.

To the northeast lies the Freiburger Weststadion, home of football club Sportfreunde Eintracht Freiburg e.V. (capacity: 3300).

The main form of public transport in Betzenhausen are trams of the Stadtbahnlinie 1 and Linie 3, the latter only running to the east tip of the district. Through its location at the edge of the western Ringroad of Freiburg as well as a feeder road, Betzenhausen can be accessed via two motorways.

In the eastern area of Bischofslinde, a government service center was erected in 2000, incorporating the Police department of Freiburg, the chemical and veterinary investigation office and the new governments presidium Freiburg.

== Buildings ==
The church of St. Thomas was built in 1767–68 by Johann Baptist Häring, and is dedicated to the Apostle Thomas. A stork's nest on the church tower is regularly inhabited by storks.
