= Flückigersee =

Excavated lake in Freiburg, Germany

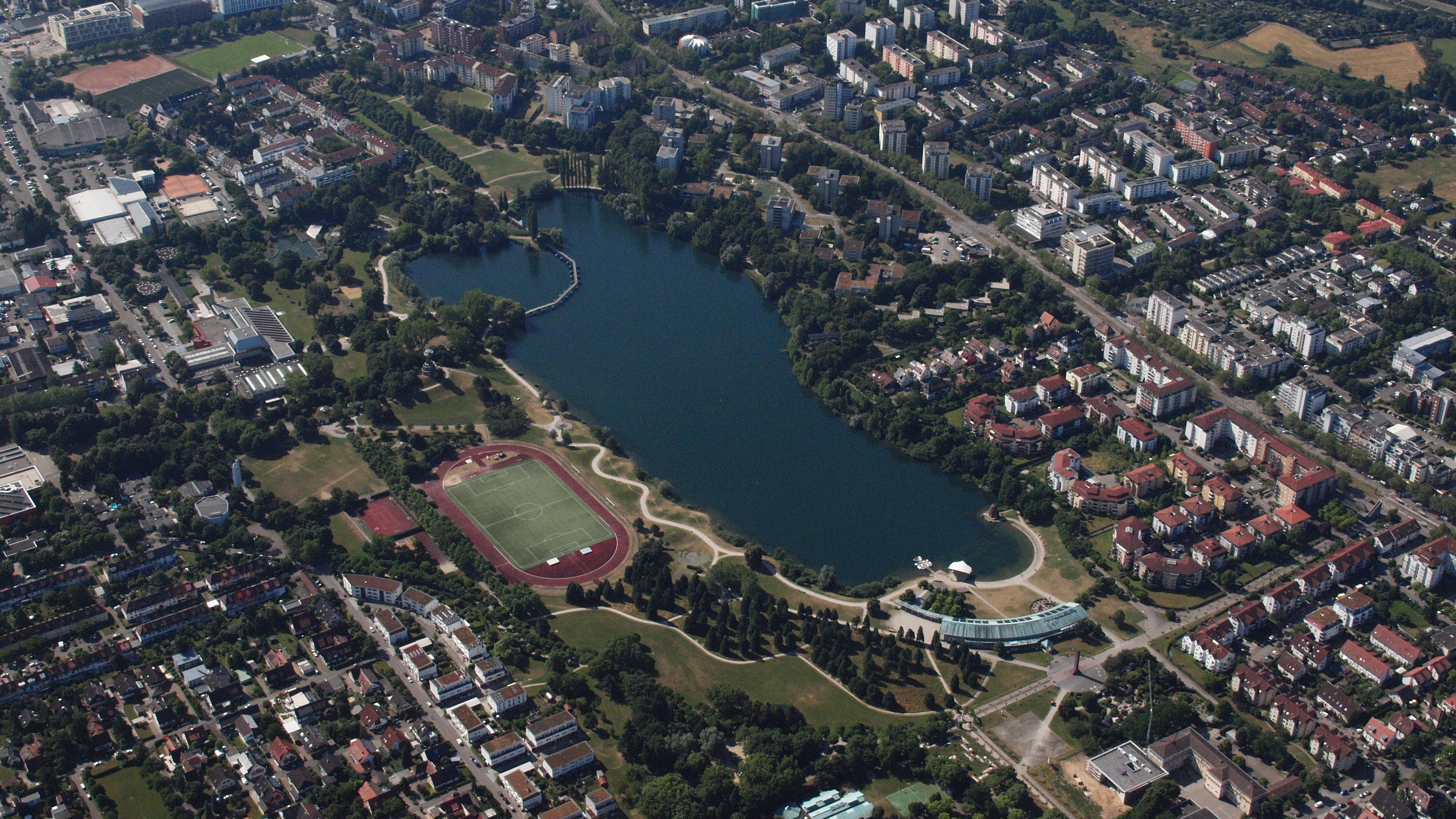

- Location within Germany
- Location: Baden-Württemberg
- Coordinates: 48°00′38″N 7°49′4″E
- Primary inflows: mainly groundwater
- Primary outflows: none (groundwater)
- Surface area: 10 ha (25 acres)
- Max. depth: 25 m (82 ft)
- Surface elevation: 240 m (790 ft)

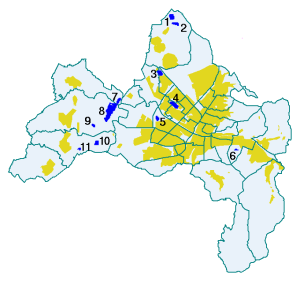
Lakes in the urban area of Freiburg im Breisgau. Location of the Flückigersee (4) in the district of Freiburg

The Flückigersee (German pronunciation: [ˈflʏkɪɡɐzeː], "Lake Flückiger") is a 10-hectare lake in the Freiburg district of Betzenhausen.

It developed from the quarrying of sand and gravel by the Flückiger construction company in the 1920s.

The mining at the lake was stopped in 1983, because the surrounding area became more and more inhabited. In 1986 the lake became part of the Landesgartenschau exhibition (an exhibition in the local area), today's Seepark.

In the year 2000 the lake's deepest point was about 25 metres. The water quality is generally good, but tiny parasitic worms called cercaria live in the lake, which can cause cercarial dermatitis. They are commonly known as swimmer's itch after being in water.

In 1999, when the city of Freiburg investigated the water quality of municipal lakes that had previously been quarried in, a strong eutrophication was found especially in the Flückigersee. As a result, the citizen and student project Flückiger See (German: Bürger- und Schülerprojekt Flückiger See) was founded at the Freiburg Eco-Station for environmental education, in order to preserve the lake.

In order to combat the overpopulation of up to 40 swans, a pair of swans were fed special food as part of the Alphaschwäne (English: Alpha Swan) project. Since 2001, the territorial behaviour of these strengthened swans has kept the lake free from outsider swans.

In 2002, a limnological office was commissioned to collect the ecological key data on the lake. A local council decision led to the results being published. They state that the main reason for the nutrient pollution is an increased phosphorus content caused by inflowing groundwater. The phosphorus probably originates from debris that was dumped into the lake after the bomb attack on Freiburg during the Second World War and the debris contained remains of phosphorus bombs, 255 tonnes of which were used during the attack. The lake used to be further to the East, in the same place where the track used to move debris after the War ended.

In 1997 and 2001 the lake was cleared of rubbish and debris by volunteers. In the summer of 2013, a diving school from Ringsheim and members of the Sea Shepherd initiated a similar clear up. The clearing also attempted to capture some of the 200 or so turtles now living in the lake (mainly red-cheeked and yellow-bellied turtles). However, they only caught two turtles. The turtles are abandoned domestic animals whose high life expectancy and food requirements endanger the ecosystem of the lake.

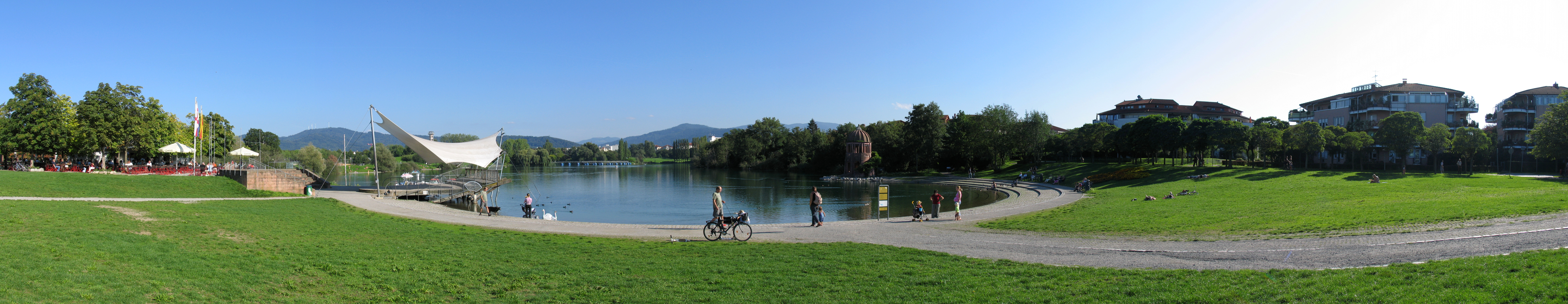
Lakeside
