= Studentensiedlung am Seepark =

Coordinates: 48.007441°N 7.819510°E

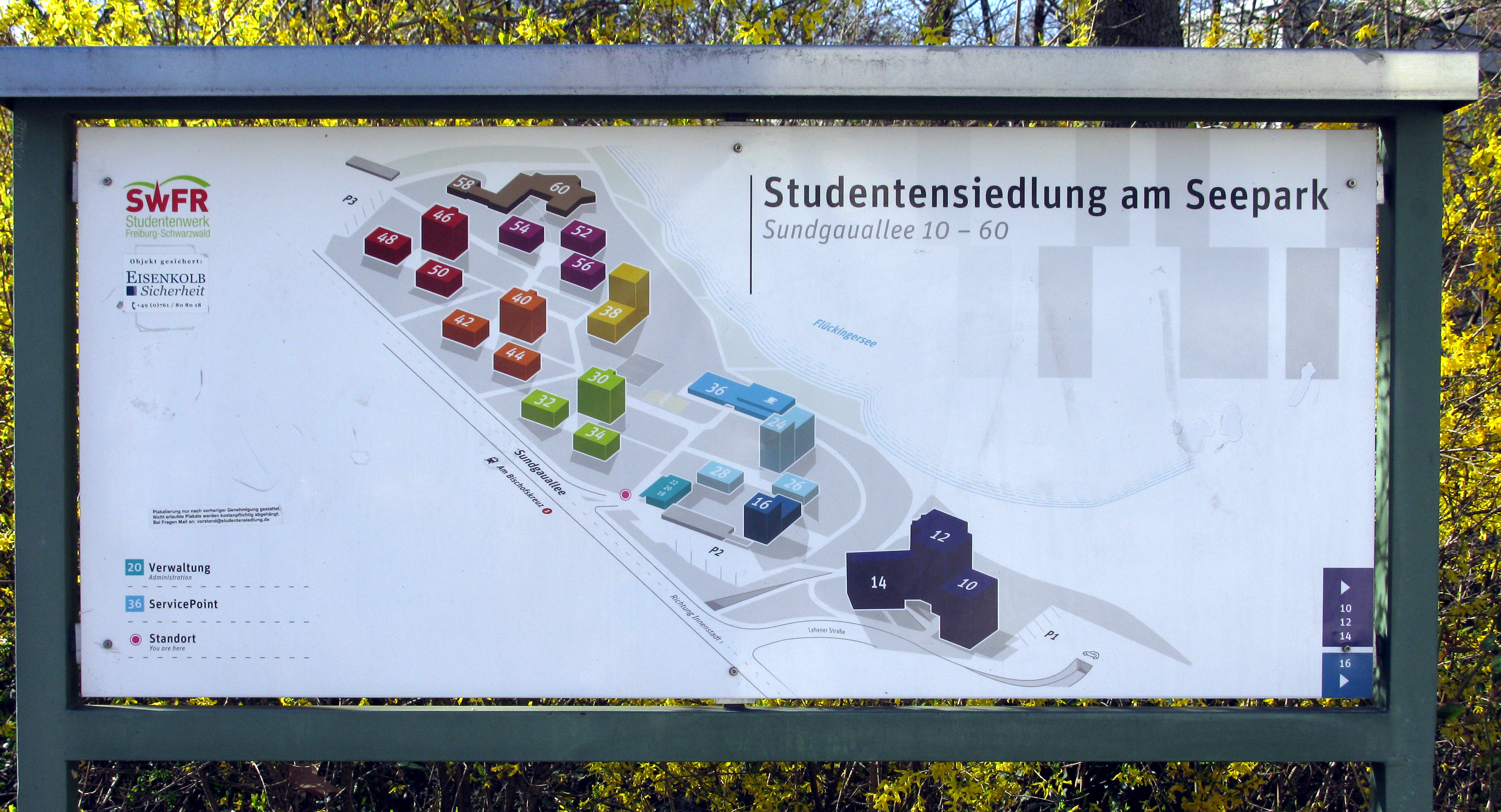
Info board with an overview of the housing complex. (2019)

The Seepark Student Quarter (German Studentensiedlung am Seepark), which is also often called “StuSie”, is Freiburg's biggest student quarter. It is located in Freiburg-Betzenhausen at Seepark and accommodates about 1.800 students in 25 buildings.

== History ==
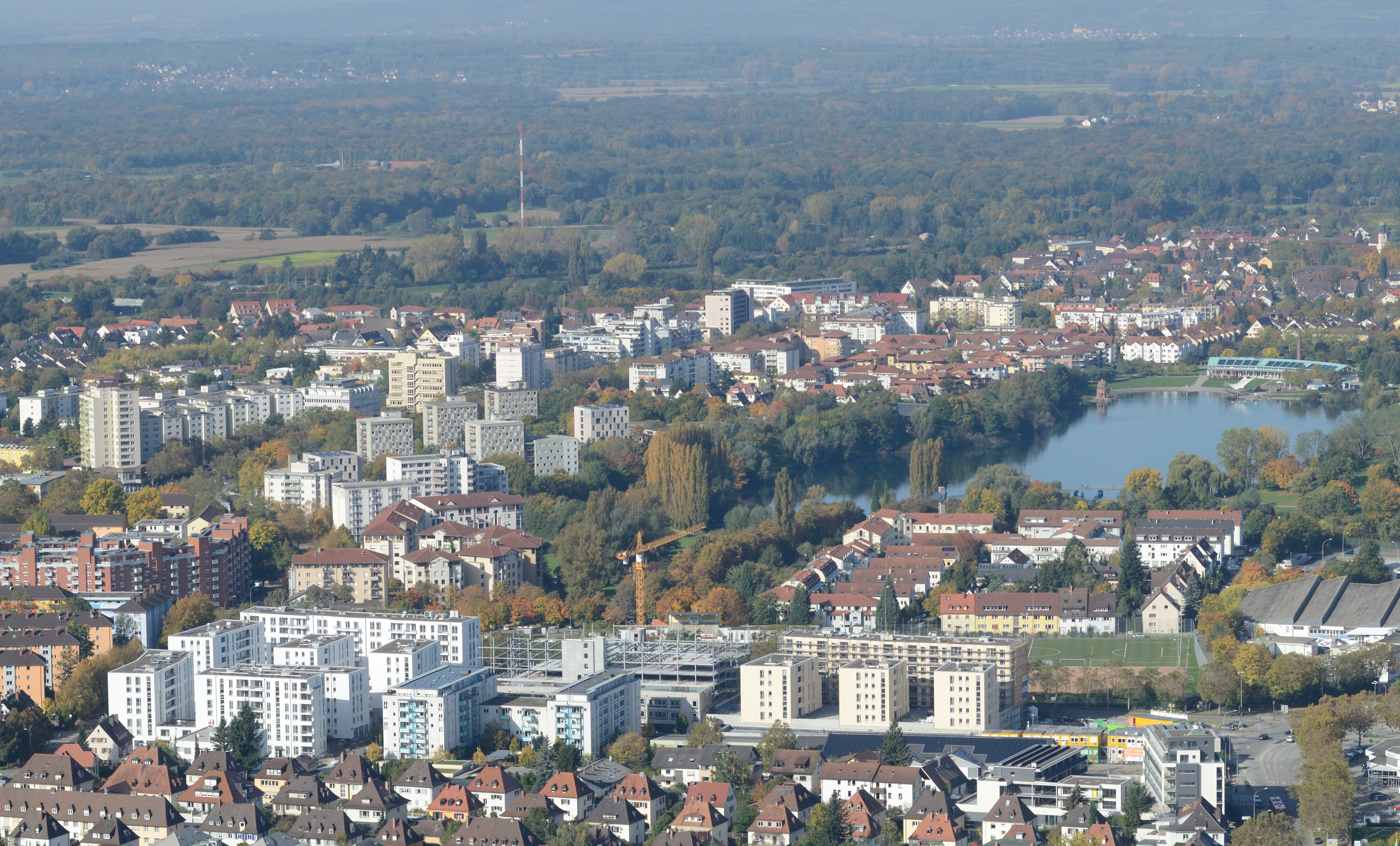
The student quarter (center left) with Seepark and Flückigersee

In 1966, the architects Wolf Irion, Rainer Graf and Wolf Maier designed the student quarter as a park-like residential area with three- and eight-story buildings. In 1989 to 1990, the architect Wolfgang P. Woseipka added a nine-story component to the already existing eleven-story house 24. Every floor in the new construction received four two-bedroom apartments and one four-bedroom apartment, which had an eat-in kitchen and an oriel with a view of the lake. The single apartments in the old building were transformed into bigger apartments including a bathroom and a kitchen, too. In 2012, the architecture's office Amann Burdenski Munkel Architekten seamlessly continued the building development under another redensification project. Small details, like the change from white to normal concrete and the staggered window openings were also adopted for the new ready-mixed concrete facades. In 2014, the architectural office was given the award “best architects 14” in the category “Home construction/Multifamily residential” for the buildings StuSie 16+38.

From 2020, the student quarter will be expanded by approximately 1.200 living spaces. The first construction phase, consisting of three new buildings, was largely completed in January 2020. At the end of August, 130 new rooms were added with the completion of house 28. In order to relieve Freiburg's housing market, the regional council Freiburg is supporting the construction of three new residential towers, including 300 apartment-sharing communities and single apartments. By 2025, 1.416 new residential units are expected to be finalized, while 217 are going to be demolished. The area is featured in the Perspektivplan Freiburg 2030, as an area of development.

== Description ==
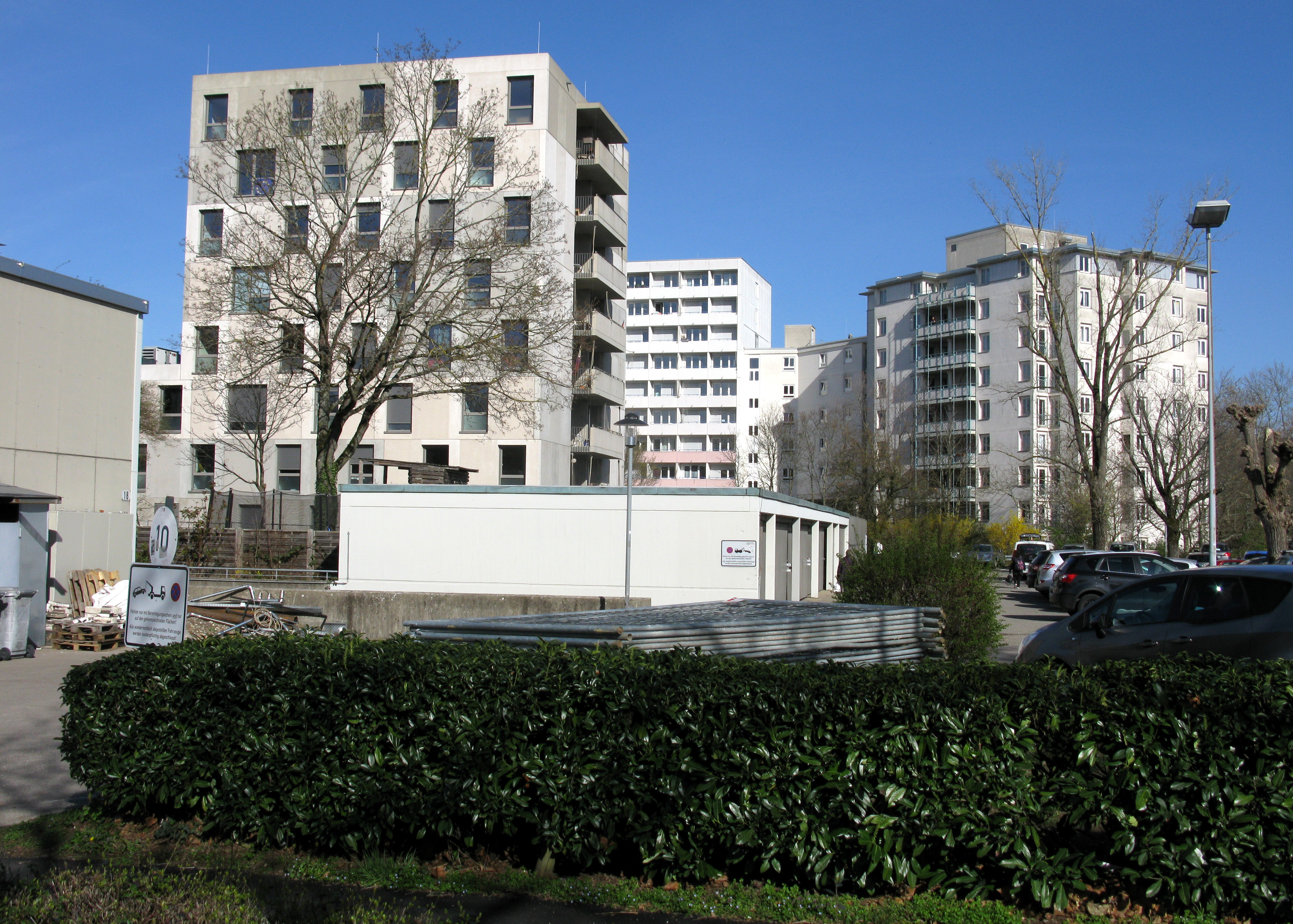
View of houses 12 and 16 at StuSie

Part of the settlement consists of five groups of houses, which consist of two three-story and one eight-story building. The new buildings are not in contrast, but in tradition with the existing buildings. Even though the redensification fits into the existing structure, more modern methods have been used during the construction process itself, which, for example, with lower transmission heat losses, is well below the requirements of the savings ordinance.

In the complex there are single apartments, shared apartments and shared floors, as well as apartments with two and three rooms for student families. There are a total of 22 two- to eleven-story houses in which facilities relevant to student life such as a bicycle workshop, wood workshop and music rooms are housed. The tallest buildings are community houses 12 and 24, each 40 m.

There are also three Max Kade houses within the settlement, some of which are available to the International Office of the University of Freiburg for foreign exchange students. Apartments are also provided for the Max Planck Institute and the International Office, in which visiting professors can live with their families.

The settlement is bounded in the northwest by the Flückigersee, and in the southwest it extends to Sundgauallee. Tram line 1 connects it to the city center and the university.

== Student Community ==
There are a couple of free time activities and community gatherings for students in the student housing areas, which are organized by the association StuSie e.V.

In some residence halls there are bars, tended and organized by other students, and some halls offer other free time activities like games, parties and other forms of student gatherings on an almost daily basis. Normally, the student associations of the Albert-Ludwigs University Freiburg im Breisgau organize department parties in one of three different locations in the residence hall area “StuSie”. Those parties can also be attended by students of other departments.

In addition to that, there are some beer-pong tournaments offered some times, which are announced online or rarely by flyer at University.
