= Zähringen =

Zähringen may refer to:

- Zähringen, a suburb of Freiburg im Breisgau, Germany
- Zähringen castle
- House of Zähringen
- SMS Zähringen, pre-dreadnought battleship of the German Imperial Navy
