= Studierendenwerk Freiburg =

German state-run organization for college students

The Studierendenwerk Freiburg (SWFR) (student administration of Freiburg) takes on the legal task of care and support of approximately 44,000 students in the higher education region of Freiburg. It is a member of the Germany's Studentenwerk, and currently it is the second largest student administration in Baden-Württemberg.

The Studierendenwerk is a public institution with about 350 employees. It currently operates 10 canteens, 7 cafeterias and the restaurant Haus zur Lieben Hand. It rents 17 student residences to students and it is active in the enforcement of Germany's Federal Training Assistant Act (Bundesausbildungsförderungsgesetz).

It operates a service portal to assist students finding student jobs, especially babysitting and private accommodation.

== Associated Universities and Colleges ==
The Studierendenwerk serves the students of the following colleges:

- Albert-Ludwigs-Universität Freiburg
- Pädagogische Hochschule Freiburg
- Hochschule für Musik Freiburg
- Evangelische Hochschule Freiburg
- Katholische Hochschule Freiburg
- IBA Studienort Freiburg
- Hochschule für Kunst, Design und Populäre Musik Freiburg
- Angell Akademie Freiburg GmbH
- Hochschule Offenburg
- Hochschule für öffentliche Verwaltung Kehl
- Hochschule Furtwangen
- Duale Hochschule Baden-Württemberg Villingen-Schwenningen
- Duale Hochschule Baden-Württemberg Lörrach

== Functions ==
The functions of the Studierendenwerke in Baden-Württemberg are stated in section two of the Studierendenwerk's charter. These functions are principally implemented through the following areas, measures and facilities:

- Gastronomy
- Student housing
- Promotion of cultural, sporting and social interests
- Childcare
- Promotion of healthy lifestyles and health guidance
- Guidance for international students
- The acquirement of financial help during studies

The Studierendenwerk also assumes the task of processing BAföG (German student finance) applications.

== Organs ==
The Studierendenwerk is represented by three organs:

- The manager, Clemens Metz, conducts business and is the supervisor of the employees.
- The administrative board consists of three representatives of the universities, three representatives of the students, three external experts working in either the public sector or municipal administration, and one representative of the Ministry of Education and Research. The administrative board appoints, oversees, and advises the manager.
- The assembly of representatives consists of members of the rectorate and the executive boards of the universities. It decides on the constitution of the Studierendenwerk and elects the members of the administrative board.

== Mensa Card ==
In the Studierendenwerk's establishments, payments are mostly made without cash, using a smart card. This so-called MensaCard is given to all registered students. It serves as a student ID, and is also used as a means of access to the facilities of the colleges. For a fee, the MensaCard is also given to visitors.

== Student dormitories ==
The Studierendenwerk currently manages 17 dormitories in the region:

| Freiburg | Studentenhäuser Campus; Studentensiedlung am Seepark; Studentenwohnheim Stühlinger; Studentenwohnheim Händelstraße; Studentendorf Vauban; Studentenhaus OIKOS; Ulrich-Zasius-Haus; Studentenhaus Lehener-Straße; Studentenwohnheim Kunzenweg; Studentenwohnheim Berliner Allee |
| Offenburg | St.-Martin-Straße; Goldgasse; Zähringerstraße |
| Kehl | Kinzigallee |
| Furtwangen | Albert-Schweitzer-Haus; Großhausberg |
| Villingen-Schwenningen | Schramberger Straße |

== Hochschulservice GmbH ==
The Studierendenwerk is the sole shareholder of the subsidiary company Hochschulservice GmbH (Higher education service Ltd). In this company, there are around 39 permanent and 200 part-time workers. It is often criticised for the low wages it pays its staff. The reason for this is that most employees are catering staff, who are paid according to the Food, Beverages and Catering Union (NGG) rate. This pay is lower than the public services wage agreement of the region, according to which the employees of the Studierendenwerk itself are paid.
