= Opfingen =

Coordinates: 48°00′N 7°43′E

Opfingen is a village to the west of Freiburg, Baden-Württemberg, Germany. It was incorporated into Freiburg on 1 December, 1971. Opfingen's main industry is the growing and production of wine.

The surrounding communities are Merdingen, Freiburg-Waltershofen, Freiburg-Tiengen, Niederrimsingen, Freiburg-St. Georgen und Freiburg-Rieselfeld.

== History ==
Opfingen was first mentioned in a document in 1006, which are preserved in two transcripts from the 14th and 15th century. The documents are related to the handing of the land, then called Ophinga, from Henry II HRH to the Roman Catholic Diocese of Basel.

Since 1 December, 1971, Opfingen has been part of the nearby city of Freiburg. Since then the population has grown by a factor of three.
