= SFE Freiburg =

German football club

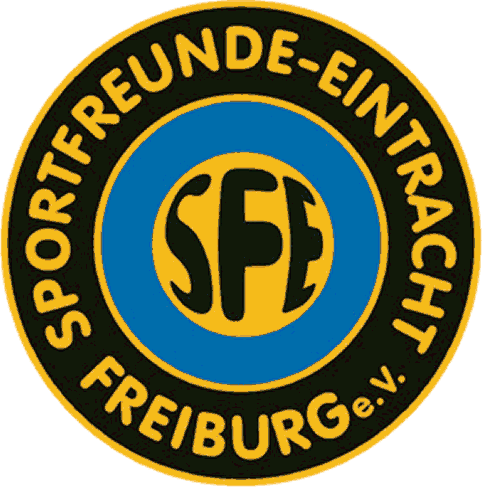
- Full name: Sportfreunde Eintracht Freiburg e.V.
- Nickname: SFE Freiburg
- Founded: 11 April 1911
- Ground: Weststadion
- Capacity: 3,300
- Website: https://sfefreiburg.de/

Sportfreunde Eintracht Freiburg (short: SFE Freiburg) are a sports club from Freiburg im Breisgau. The official team colours are yellow, black and blue.

== History ==
On 11 April 1911, the club Hertha Freiburg was founded, which was renamed to FC Sportfreunde 1911 Freiburg in the spring of 1912. On 16 September 1946, the club was disbanded and FC Sportfreunde Betzenhausen was formed by merging with Alemannia Zähringen, which was disbanded again in 1950. Since then, the club has operated as FC Sportfreunde 1911 Freiburg.

Known under this name, the men's first team gained promotion to Amateurliga Südbaden, which was the third tier of the football league system at that time. Apart from the 1968–69 season, which they finished in fifth place, the team played in the bottom half of the table until being relegated in 1975.

In May 1976, Sportfreunde Eintracht merged with part of SV Eintracht DJK Freiburg to form FC Sportfreunde DJK Freiburg. The club's next great success was qualifying for the German Cup competition (DFB-Pokal) in 1979. The first round was an away game against FC Union Neumünster in Schleswig-Holstein, which they won 2–0. The team was eliminated from the competition after the 2–7 defeat against SV Waldhof Mannheim.

What was originally a football club has since become a sports club with several departments. A gymnastics department was formed in 1972, then a department for skiing and hiking in 1977. The following year, in 1978, a department for handball was formed, in 1980 one for volleyball and finally, in 1981, one for tennis.

In 1987, the football team returned to tier three. During the 1987–88 season, Sportfreunde competed against teams like Freiburger FC, VfR Mannheim, Offenburger FV, SV Sandhausen and SpVgg 07 Ludwigsburg in the Oberliga Baden-Württemberg. They were relegated after finishing in 17th place.

On 1 July 2004, Sportfreunde DJK Freiburg merged with SV Eintracht Freiburg to form today's club Sportfreunde Eintracht Freiburg.

== Venues ==
Sportfreunde first played on Fedderstraße, and later on the so-called "Dreispitz", before finding accommodation on the parade ground from 1918 to 1937. They played home matches on Grenzstraße from 1937 until 1944. After the sports ground had been destroyed, they played on Waldkircher Straße for two years and on Messplatz, Schwarzwaldstraße from 1947 until 1951. Finally, in 1951, they moved to Weststadion, Grenzstraße (a football stadium in Mooswald), which could hold up to 5000 spectators. From 2006 until 2008, the home venue was shared between Sportfreunde and the Bundesliga-women from SC Freiburg.

== Former players ==
- (Germany) Joachim Löw
- (Germany) Dieter Wendling (1978–1979)
