= Stingray Swamp Flora Reserve =

Protected area in New South Wales, Australia

- IUCN category VI (protected area with sustainable use of natural resources)
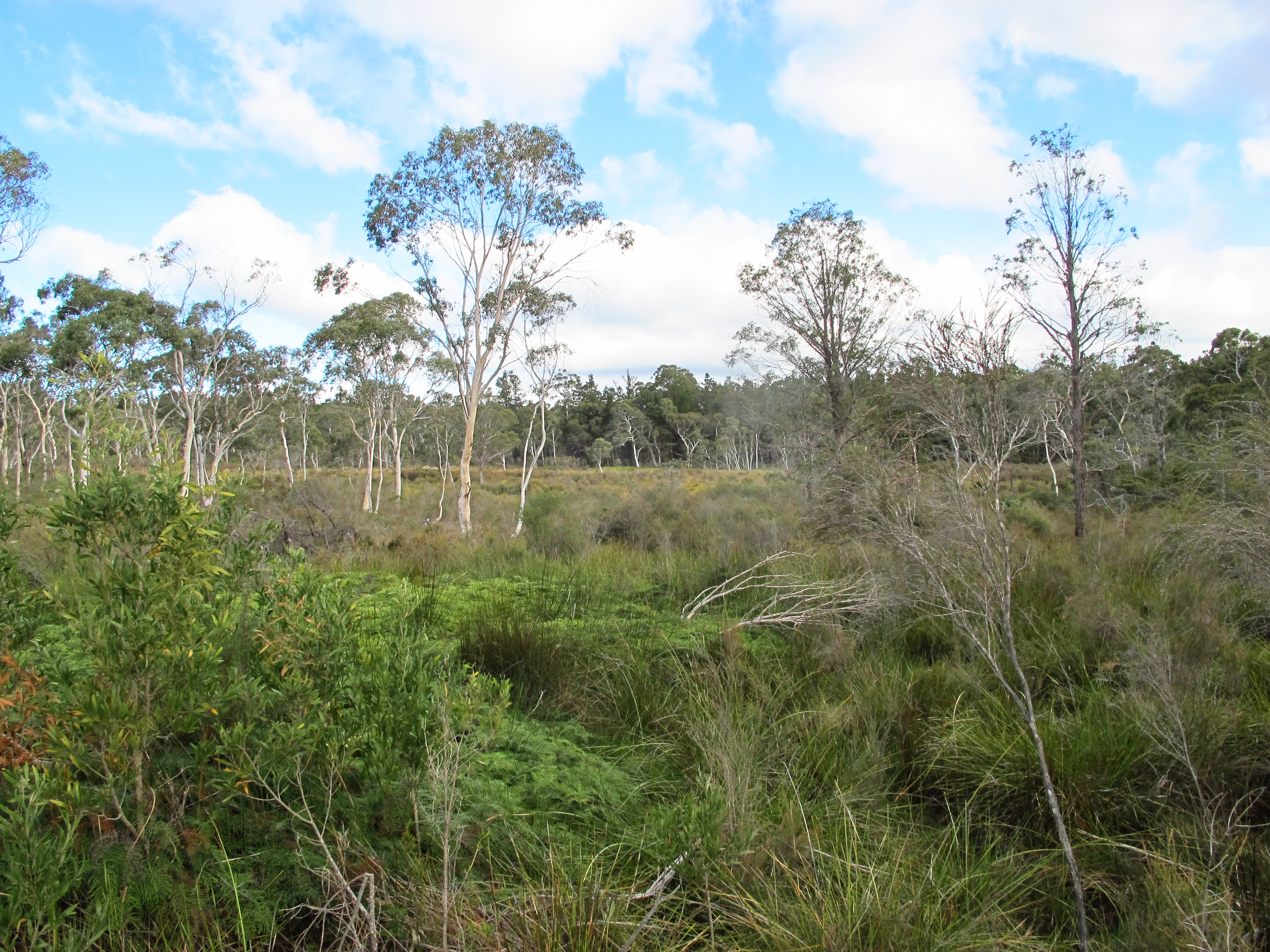
- Example of swamp vegetation

- Location within New South Wales
- Location: New South Wales
- Nearest city: Penrose
- Coordinates: 34°38′31.6″S 150°13′32.2″E
- Area: 34 km^{2} (13 sq mi)

Stingray Swamp Flora Reserve (SWFR) is located immediately north of Penrose township in the south-western region of Wingecarribee Shire. The reserve is primarily surrounded by the Penrose State Forest, which is a commercially active plantation forest administered by the Forest Corporation NSW. Pine species dominate the state forest with a mix of native vegetation types in isolated pockets and adjacent areas. Stingray Swamp Flora Reserve belongs to a larger wetland complex known as the Paddy's River Wetland Complex (PRWC). These wetlands also form part of the Paddy's River sub-catchment, which belong to the larger Hawkesbury-Nepean catchment. Historic use of this area has mainly been that of pine plantation, agriculture and mining activities. The forest is publicly accessible and therefore is a site of mixed recreational activities.

== Geology, geomorphology & soils ==
The reserve is located within a landscape of rolling low-to-medium profile hills with minimal geologic outcropping. Predominant geologic units are Hawkesbury Sandstone, Berry Siltstone and shale units. Hawkesbury sandstone is the prominent geologic unit and can be seen at several outcroppings especially along watercourses. Nattai tableland and Penrose variants form the predominant soil landscape units within and adjacent to the study area. The soils types are mostly swamp and floodplain deposits that consist of clayey sand with heavy organic and poorly draining characteristics; quaternary alluvium overlies the majority of Hawkesbury sandstone. The geomorphic character of SWFR is identified as “Temperate Highland Peat Swamps on Sandstone” and is classified as an ecological community. SWFR sits atop sandstone units in a natural depression that is bounded to the north by a significant hill with protrusions of sandstone units. Geomorphic characteristics as a swamp mark it is an important hydrologic and fluvial unit within the landscape. SWFR is situated within the upper reach of Paddys River, which forms part of the Wollondilly sub-catchment. The Wollondilly sub-catchment is a major component of the southern rivers sub-catchment; located within the Hawkesbury-Nepean catchment.

== Ecological character ==
Stingray Swamp is composed of a rich array of flora and fauna, which is influenced to a large extent by the underlying biophysical and geomorphic character. The flora of the immediate region consists of dry sclerophyll forest, montane peat shrubs and Cumberland plain woodland species. Stingray swamp exhibits a distinctive and rich mixture of heath, shrub, grasses and fern species. The central areas within the swamp are dense with low canopies of around 1.5–2 meters in height. Leptospermum and coral fern species are dominant features within the floral makeup of the ecosystem. Vegetation grades to open woodland on the outer edges and away from swamp areas. These areas are dominated by eucalyptus species in the range of 5–15 meters tall. Animal species range from birds, reptiles, insects and mammals with current records indicating 15 species. Most notable is the variety of birdlife due to dense vegetation, which has drawn bird watching groups. SWFR is also host to several state and nationally protected and endangered species. Of note are the following species that area listed at State and National levels:

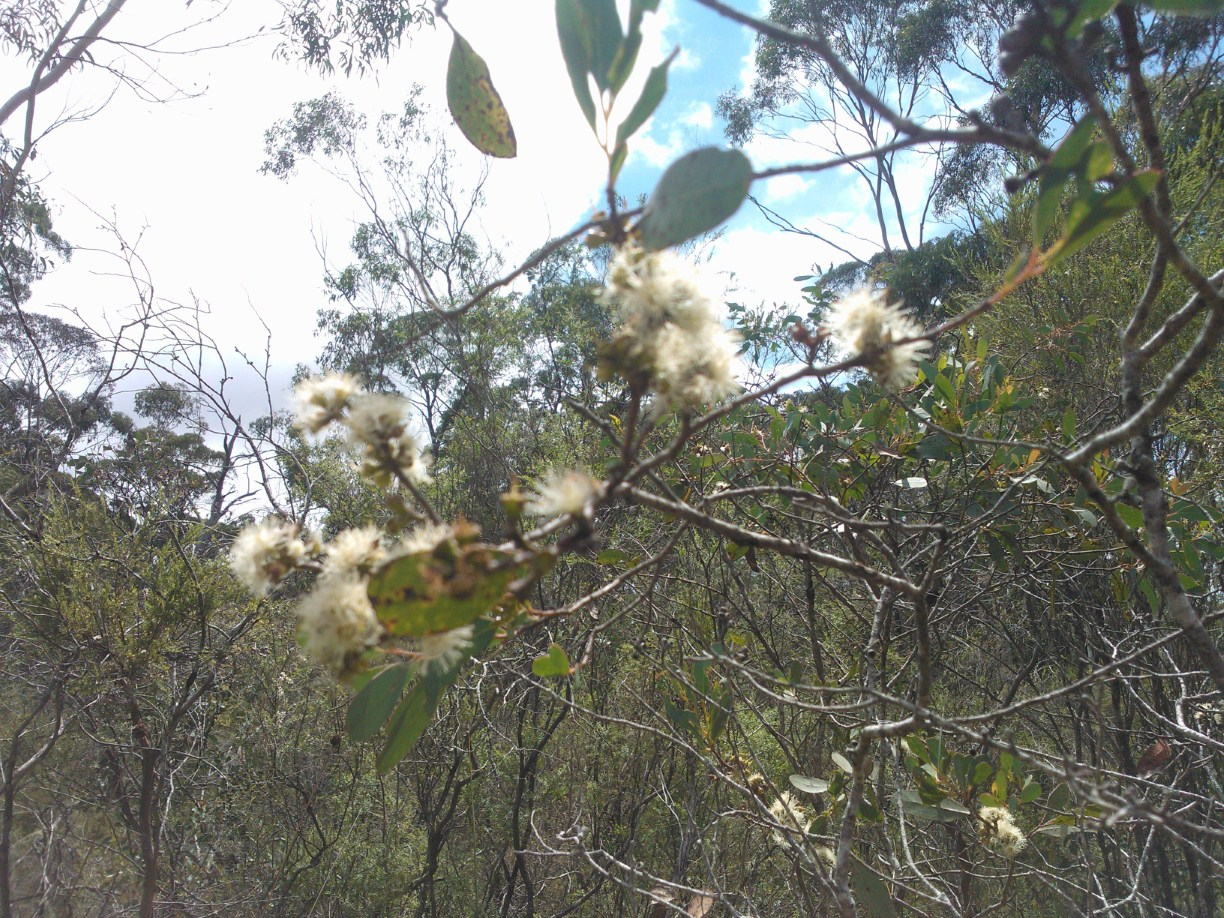
Flowers of the Broad-leaved sally (Eucalyptus aquatica)

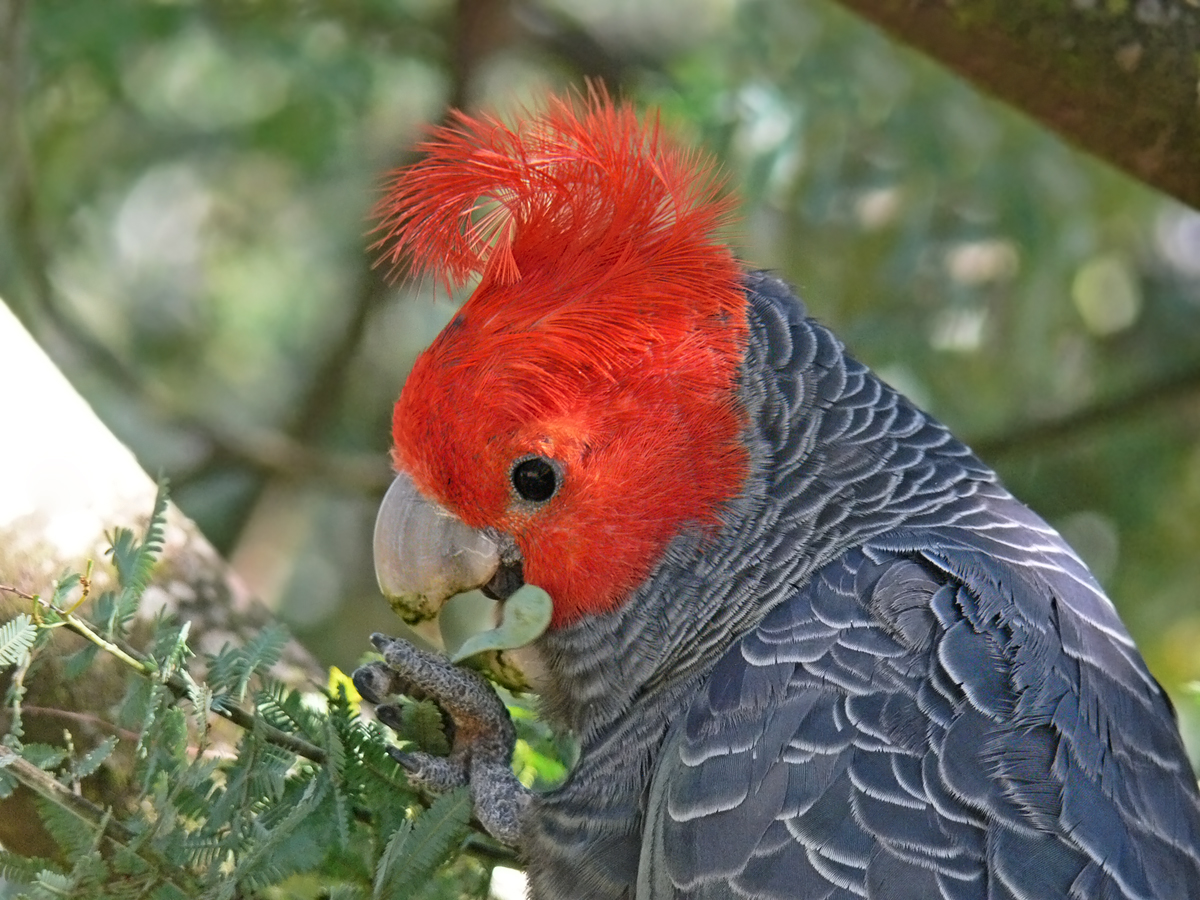
Gang-Gang-cockatoo

Species	Status
Broad-leaved sally (Eucalyptus aquatica)	Protected; Vulnerable
Camden Woollybutt (Eucalyptus macarthurii)	Protected; Vulnerable
Dwarf Phyllota (Phyllota humifusa)	Protected; Vulnerable
Woolly Tea Tree (Leptospermum lanigerum)	Protected
Prostrate Cone bush (Isopogon prostratus)	Protected
Gang-gang cockatoo (Callocephalon fimbriatum)	Protected; Vulnerable; Sensitivity Class 3
Scarlet robin (Scarlet Robin)	Vulnerable; Protected
Giant Dragonfly (Petalura gigantea)	Endangered

== Cultural and Indigenous heritage ==
The cultural values of SWFR are not present in any structures or sites of historic importance. Historic ties to the area are bound up in the activities undertaken in the state forest. Plantation has occurred for at least 90 years in PSF and has been a regional commercial activity since the 1920s. A historic road, Old Argyle Road, skirts the south eastern boundary of SWFR and was once part of Old South Road, which assisted the early development of the region through providing a transport route throughout the centre of the shire. Aboriginal heritage within and surrounding the study area is largely unknown. The regional existence of Gandangara and Tharawal peoples are known to have passed through the area and should be a first point of contact. The Wingecarribee area and therefore the SWFR reside within the Illawarra Local Aboriginal Land Council region and should be the first point of contact when seeking Aboriginal heritage information.

== Environmental threats and hazards ==
Ongoing forestry activities pose threats to the integrity of the flora reserve through several processes. Of main concern is the invasion of radiata pine (Pinus radiata) species that is utilised within the plantation. These species migrate into native forests and establish themselves in dense groups. Observed Radiata species has been noted and ongoing Landcare action in and around the flora reserve aims to remove these species. Lantana (Lantana camara) and English holly (Ilex aquifolium), whilst not currently found within SWFR, pose a direct threat to native species. Harvesting activities occur adjacent to and upslope from the SWFR and may alter hydraulic and geomorphic processes. Clear cutting of select areas upslope from SWFR may increase sediment loading within the waterways within the swamps.

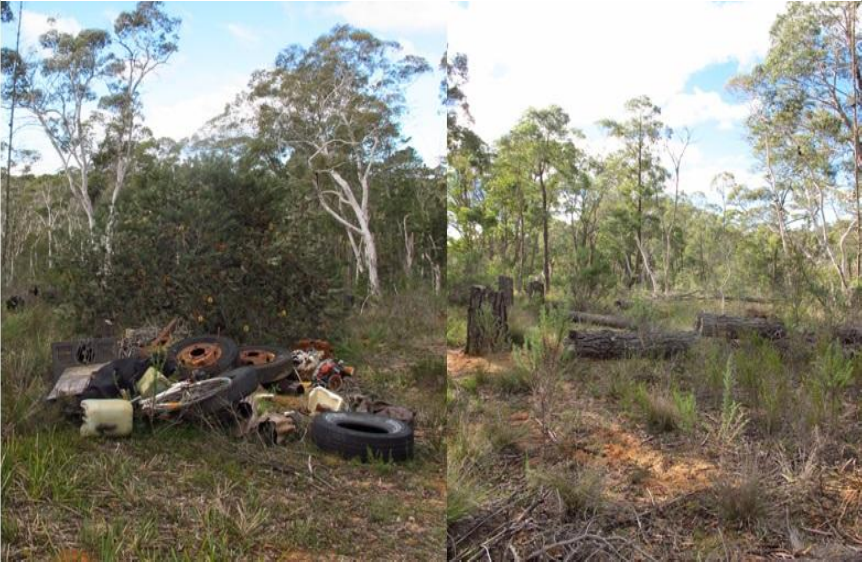
(Left) Rubbish dumped in SWFR; (Right) Radiata pine removal in SWFR

== Reserve management ==
Currently there are no publicly available plans or documents outlining management activities within the flora reserve. However, its status as flora reserve gives some assurance for some level of protection for biodiversity. Secondly, the Regional Forestry Agreement specifies the requirement for management plans for land set aside as reserves per legislative requirements. Forests NSW sets a goal to create a management plan for the flora reserve within their Ecologically sustainable development Management Plan for the relevant forestry region. As of yet there is no further information available to the public as to the details of the management plan. However, the past and present Landcare work may be a sign of active engagement with biodiversity management activities.

== See also ==
Protected areas of New South Wales
