= Sankt Georgen (Freiburg) =

Coordinates: 47°58′52″N 7°48′15″E

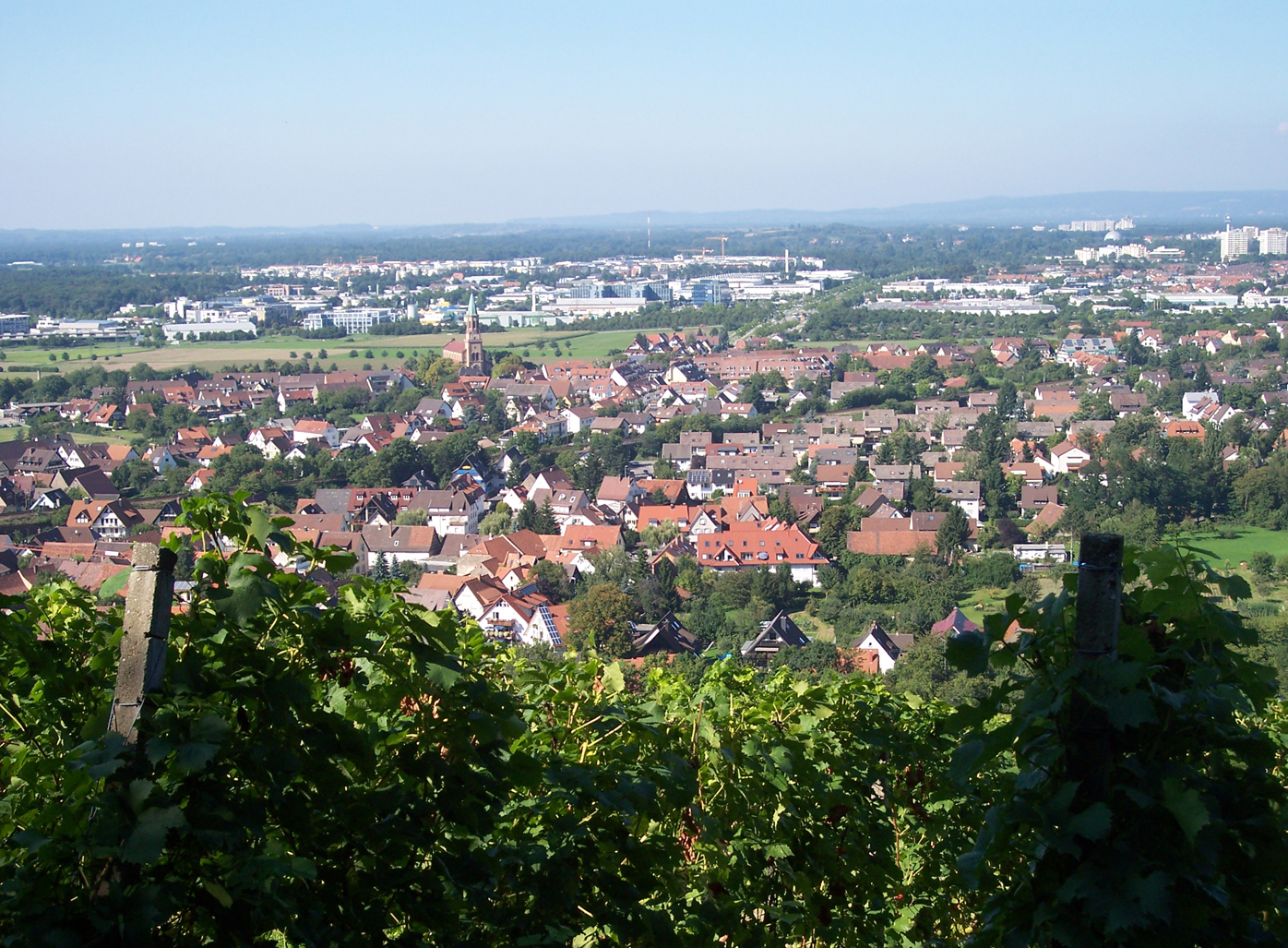
View from Schönberg to Sankt Georgen.

Freiburg-St.Georgen (German pronunciation: [ˌzaŋkt ˈɡeːɔʁɡn̩]; Low Alemannic: Sant-Jerge) is a district of the German city Freiburg and consists of three villages: Uffhausen, Wendlingen and Sankt Georgen itself. Sankt Georgen became a part of Freiburg in 1937. It is bordered by the Schönberg in the South, Merzhausen to the South-East, the Wiehre to the East, Haslach to the North-West and the Rieselfeld to the North-East. To the South-West it borders Schallstadt and Opfingen and Tiengen to the West.

== History ==
The first settlements in the area can be traced back to the 8th century BC, around the area of what today is called Uffhausen. One road and water well from Roman times can be dated to around 50 BC. The first official Allemanic settlement was founded and first mentioned as Wendlingen December 26, 768, as Wendlingen. This date is perceived as the official founding date of Sankt Georgen today. Uffhausen was first mentioned in 873.
