= Berry Siltstone =

Sedimentary rock native to Australia

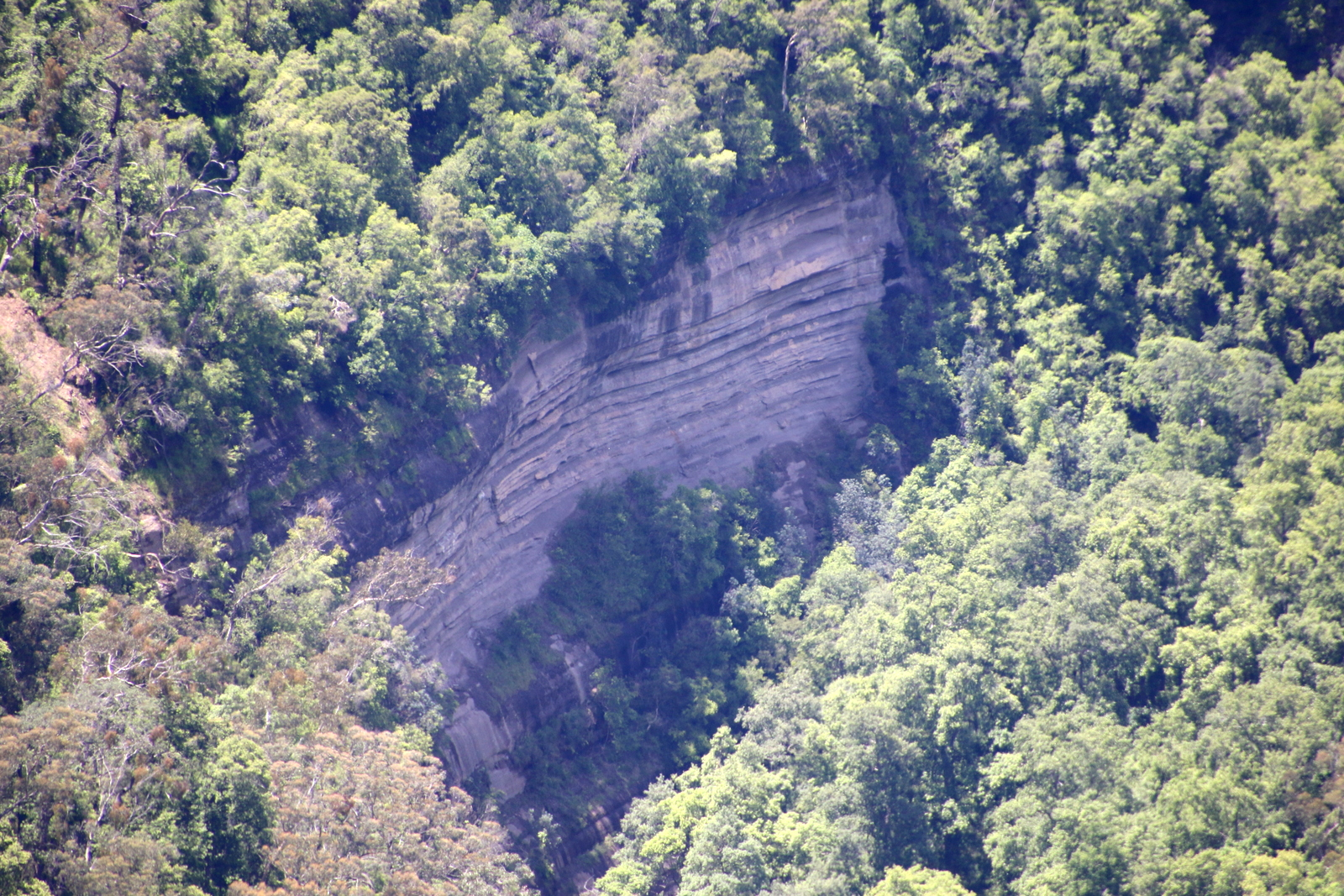
Grose Valley, Australia

Berry Siltstone is a sedimentary rock from the Shoalhaven Group, occurring in the Sydney Basin in eastern Australia. Heavy yellow clay soils form from this strata. Consisting mostly of siltstone, it may be seen in areas such as the Southern Highlands, Illawarra and at the base of the Grose Valley. Berry Siltstone was laid down on the ocean floor in the Permian around 260 million years ago, when this location was situated at the South Pole.

== See also ==
- Sydney Basin
- Illawarra Coal Measures
- Budgong Sandstone
