= Viviane Sigg =

German politician (born 1980)

- Sigg in 2025

Member of the Landtag of Baden-Württemberg
- Incumbent
- Assumed office 11 May 2026

Personal details
- Born: 12 June 1980 (age 46)
- Party: Social Democratic Party (since 2012)

Viviane Sigg (born 12 June 1980) is a German politician serving as a member of the Landtag of Baden-Württemberg since 2026. She has served as deputy chairwoman of the Social Democratic Party in Baden-Württemberg since 2026.
