= Rieselfeld =

- Stadtteil of Freiburg im Breisgau
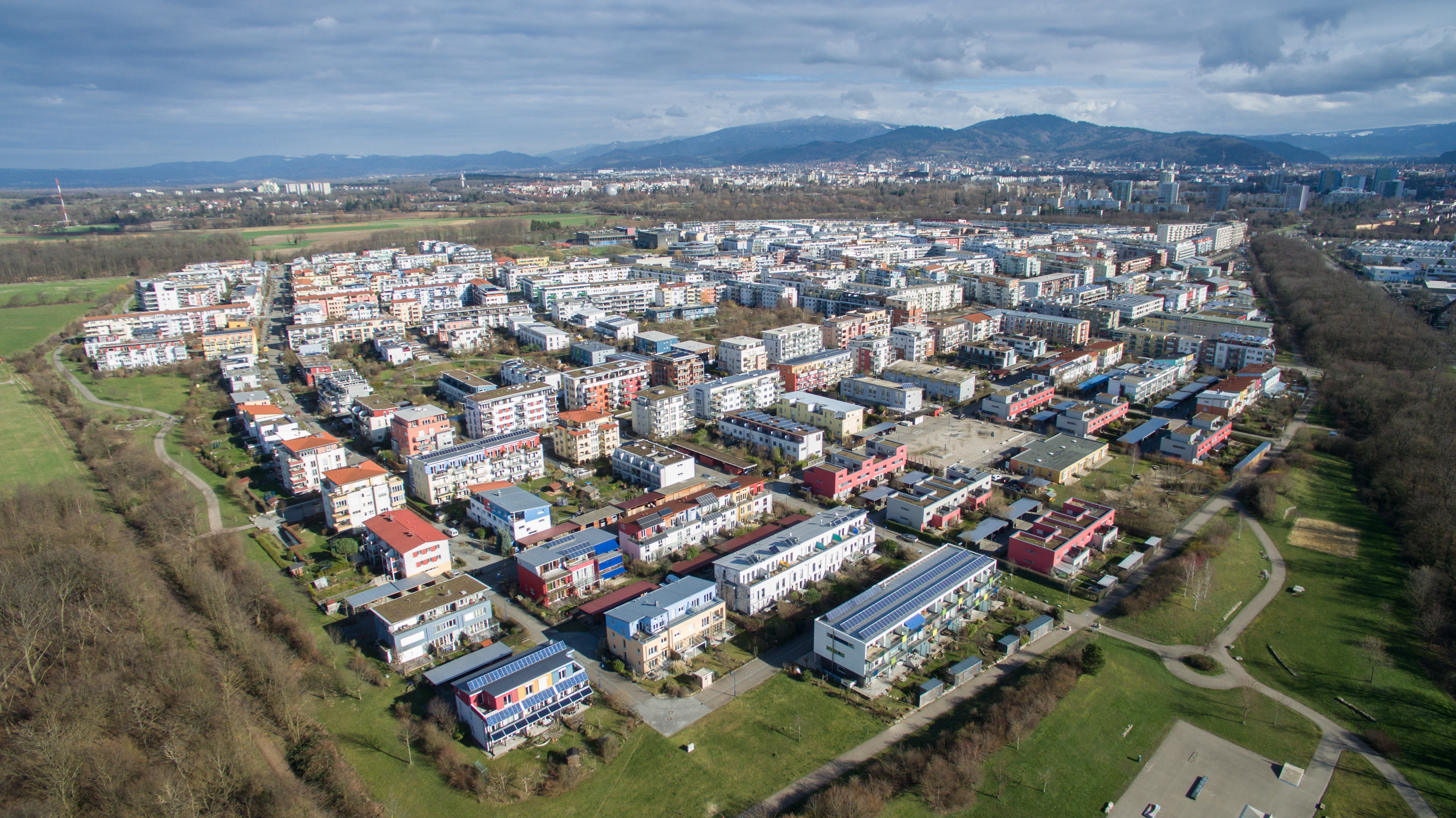

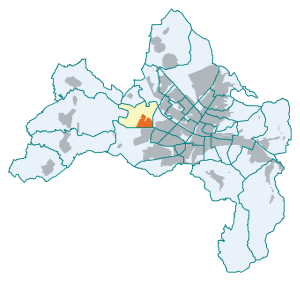
- Location of Rieselfeld within Freiburg im Breisgau
- Interactive map of Rieselfeld
- Location within Germany Location within Baden-Württemberg
- Coordinates: 47°59′56″N 7°47′30″E
- Country: Germany
- State: Baden-Württemberg
- City: Freiburg im Breisgau

Area
  - Total: 3.93 km^{2} (1.52 sq mi)
- Elevation: 232 m (761 ft)

Population (2020-12-31)
  - Total: 9,560
  - Density: 2,430/km^{2} (6,300/sq mi)
- Time zone: UTC+01:00 (CET)
  - Summer (DST): UTC+02:00 (CEST)
- Postal codes: 79111
- Dialling codes: 0761

Rieselfeld (German pronunciation: [ˈʁiːzl̩fɛlt]) is a city quarter (Stadtteil) in Freiburg im Breisgau. It is located in the western part of the city and borders the nature reserve Freiburger Rieselfeld in the west, right next to a little zoo called Tiergehege Mundenhof, Opfinger Straße in the south and Besançonallee in the east. The industrial area Haid is part of the Sankt Georgen district and is located to the south of Rieselfeld, while the district Weingarten is situated to the east of Rieselfeld.

== History ==
The word Rieselfeld means leach field in German and refers to how the area started. To ensure wastewater disposal for the city, which had grown to a population number of over 50,000 inhabitants, Freiburg acquired an area spanning 500 hectares from the University of Freiburg in 1891. After Nazism had ended, Sinti, among them some who had survived the Holocaust, settled in the area of Haid, a district adjacent to today's Rieselfeld. The Opfinger Siedlung, home of alleged outlaws and criminals, was also very close by. Living in these areas, which were not yet situated in the city, meant societal exclusion for the inhabitants.

In 1985, the sewage plant had to be shut down due to insufficient capacity to deal with wastewater. The amount of wastewater had increased to 90,00 m³ per day and the disposal could not be handled without preparing the soil of the area beforehand, which caused additional legal problems.

The Rieselfeld district was established in 1992 when a competition to design city districts was initiated. The group "Süd-West" from Lörrach won the competition together with the architectural firm Böwer Eith Murken Spiecker, the architect Manfred Morlock and the landscaper Bernd Meier. The overall management was assigned to Hans Rudolf Güdemann.

After several soil analyses and the subsequent soil stripping, all requirements were fulfilled to build on the former wastewater disposal area. In 1993, work started in the first segment. In 1994, the first apartments were being built and only two years later, the first apartments were finished and given over to the new inhabitants. The next year, the Clara-Grunwald primary school was opened and the Kepler Gymnasium, which already existed at this point, was moved into the newly built complex. Additionally, the Sepp-Glaser gym was dedicated and the initial work for the second and third segments of project “Rieselfeld” were started. To ensure public transportation to Freiburg's city centre, tram line 5 was also installed in 1997.

In 2000, work for the fourth and last segment of “Rieselfeld” started. One year later, a park was added, as well as a church and a community centre. In July 2006, work to expand the Kepler Gymnasium began.

== Funding ==
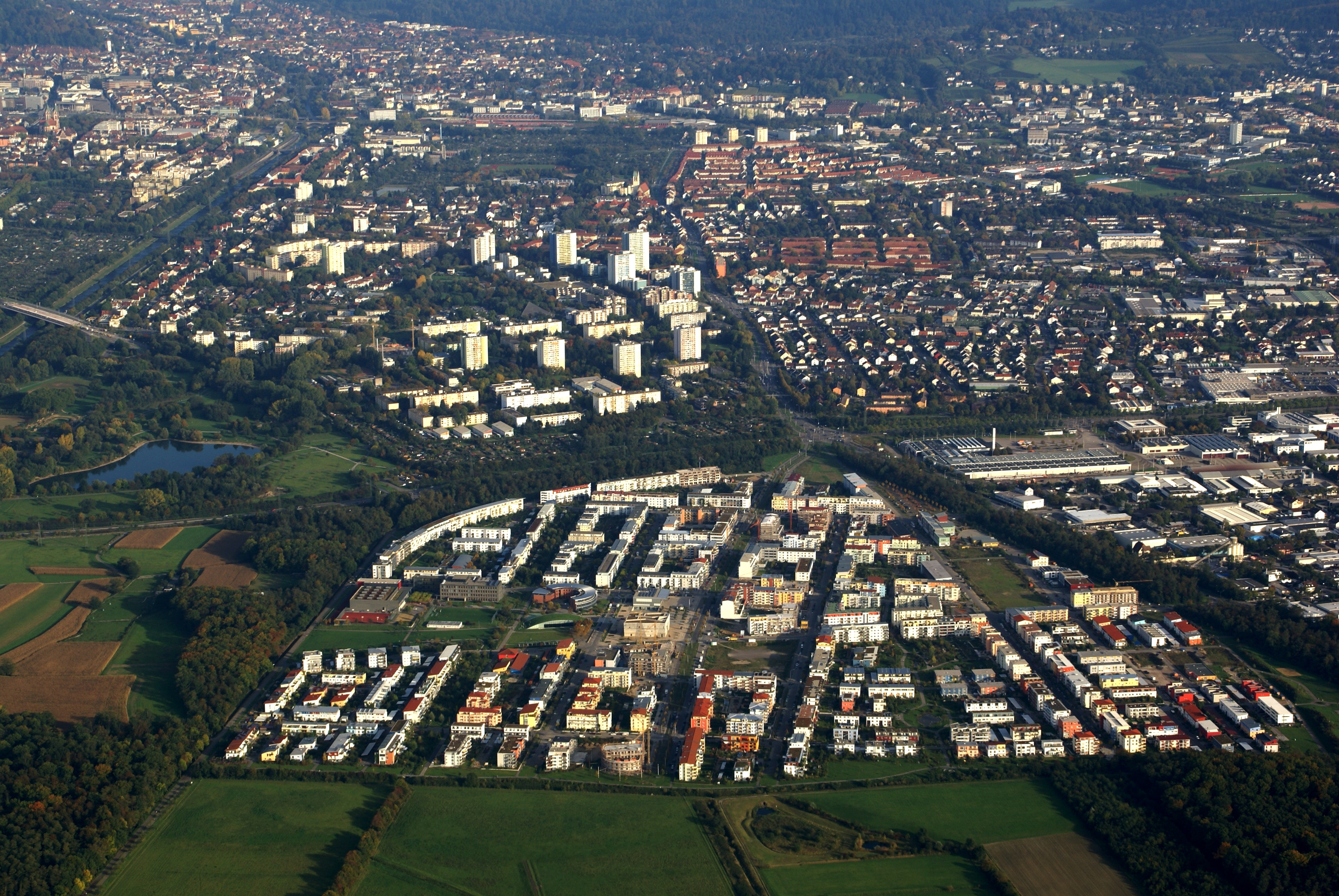
Rieselfeld (October 2007)

Since the site was owned by the city funding for planning and development costs was raised through the sale of the site itself. The initial costs currently amount to 145 million euros, of which 85 million were offset by the sale of the site. The Rieselfeld Project was coordinated by the building department, specifically the newly founded group called “Projektgruppe Rieselfeld”. The development of the site was undertaken by commercial building contractors as well as private property developers, that is to say a collaborative association. In order to prevent an area of homogenous buildings, each investor was only allowed to build 40 housing units in one area, which equals three building plots.

== Architecture ==
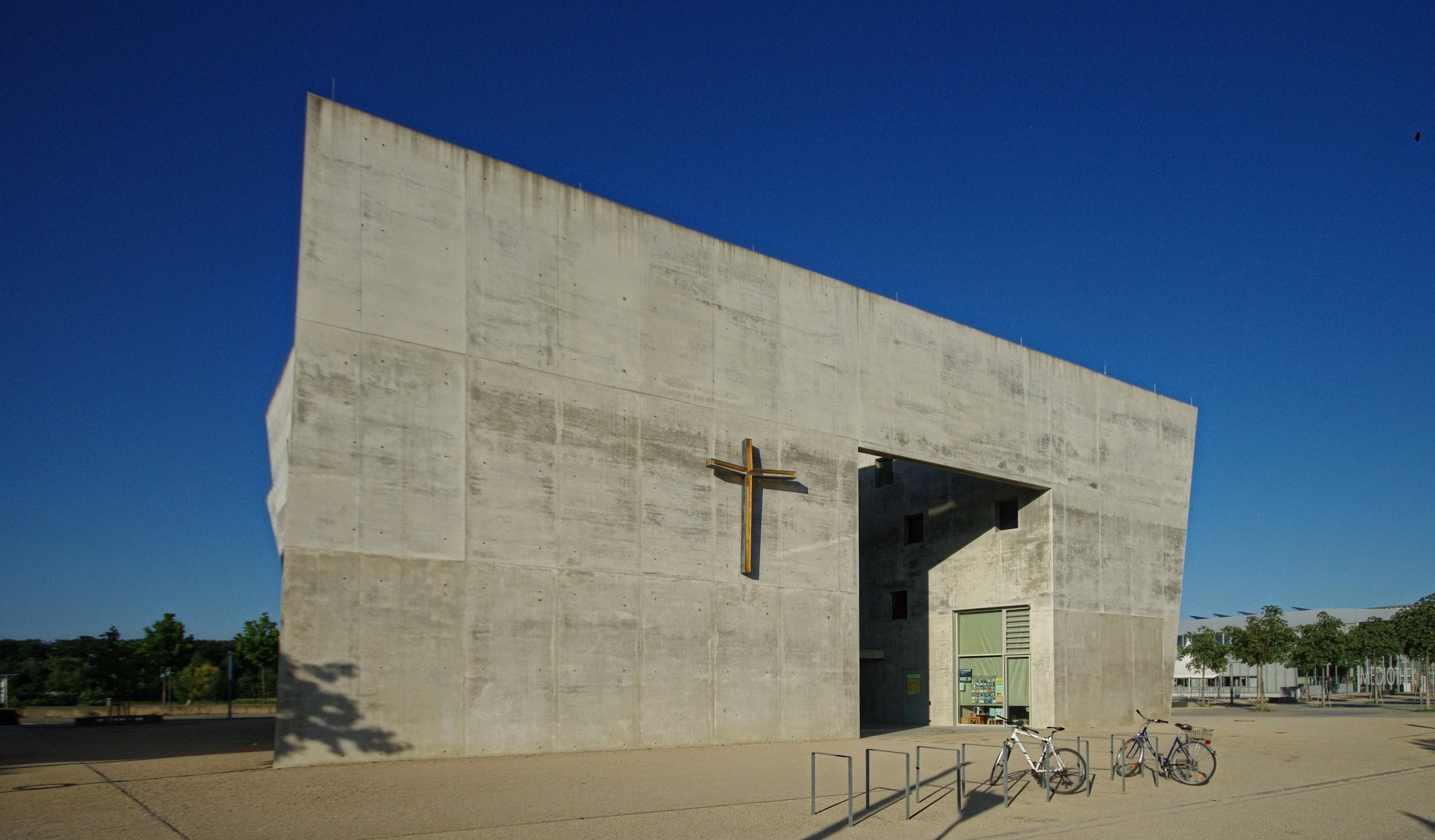
Maria-Magdalena-Kirche

Almost all the apartments in Rieselfeld are arranged in rows of houses along the street with green spaces and gardens in between and in back. Urban style buildings, with no space in between, were, however, built along the Rieselfeldallee which functioned as a principal axis for the area and accommodated the tram line. In order to ensure a heterogenous social structure, rental and owner-occupied apartments as well as single family homes and blocks of flats were not separated from each other. With regards to environmental sustainability the entire development is constructed to be energy saving, mostly using renewable power sources. In addition, the district is both entirely wheelchair and buggy friendly. The Maria-Magdalena Church is a compact concrete building designed by Susanne Gross, an architect from Cologne. The fact that it is a church is not immediately obvious, especially as it is missing a tower. It is located in the centre of Rieselfeld and is, somewhat unusually, home to both a Catholic and Lutheran Church which are both named after Mary Magdalene. The two Churches are separated by a large foyer with a side wall which can be moved to make a large joint room out of the two sacred spaces.

== Demography ==
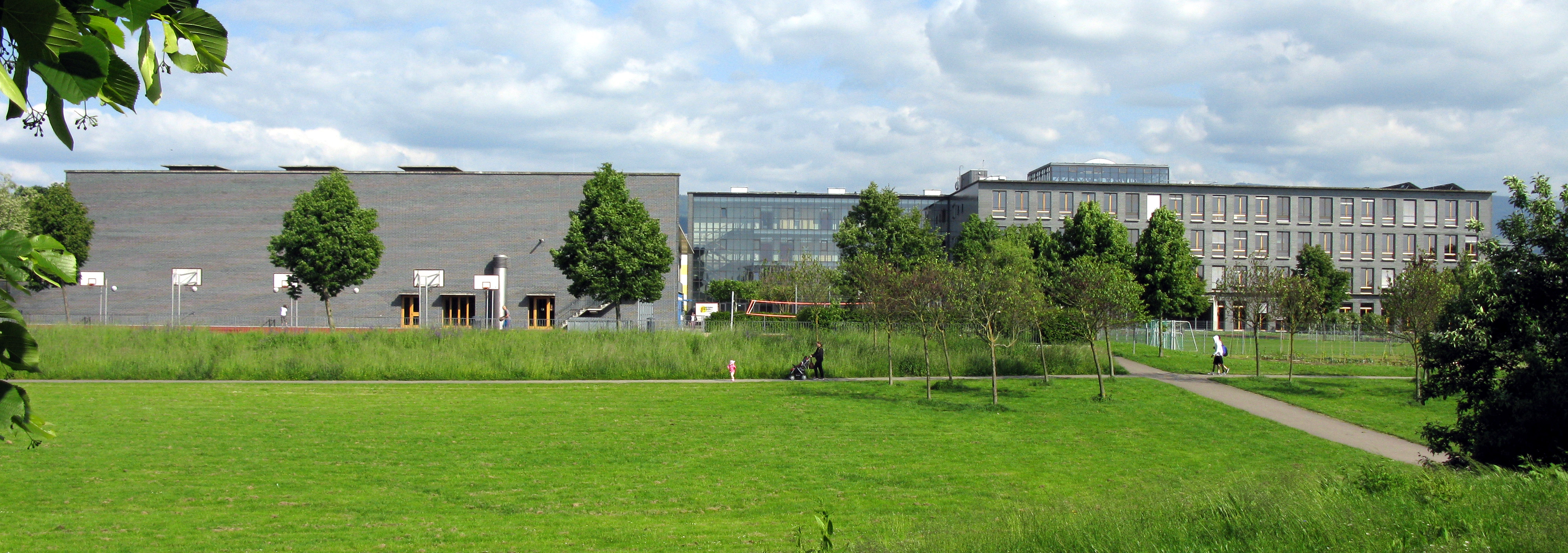
Kepler-Gymnasium (a High School in Rieselfeld)

The demographic of Rieselfeld is characterised by two striking factors:

- Of the 6000 residents living in the district midway through 2004, 75% were from the city of Freiburg or from nearby areas.
- Around one third of the residents are under 18.

With regards to the second point, three schools - a primary school, a secondary school (which was relocated there from the city centre) and the third Waldorf School in Freiburg - as well as several nurseries have been built.

== Job market ==
Among other things, the district was designed to enable residents to find a job in Rieselfeld or in the immediate vicinity (e.g. the industrial area Haid). After construction in the district was completed in 2013, around 1,000 new jobs in kindergartens, schools, restaurants and doctor's surgeries have since been created.

== Traffic regulations ==
All streets in the district have a speed limit of 30 kmh (approximately 18,6 mph) in order to keep individual traffic low and make the district quiet and family-friendly. The tram line 5, leading through the main street of the district, has connected Rieselfeld with the city centre since 1997 and enables people to reach it within 15 to 20 minutes by getting on the tram at one of the three stops Maria-von-Rudloff-PLatz, Geschwister-Scholl-Platz and Bollerstaudenstraße. Rieselfeld is also served by several bus lines.

== Parks ==
A small park was built right next to the secondary school Kepler-Gymnasium in the north of Rieselfeld, including a lawn for sunbathing and a playground for children. The primary school Clara-Grundwald-Grundschule is opposite the Kepler-Gymnasium. The green roof of the primary school's gym is accessible and connects the park with the Maria-von-Rudloff-Patz. There is also a sports field north of Mundenhofer Straße. The second park is located in the southwest of the district. It is a wetland biotope that is watered only with rainwater from the surrounding rooftops. Wild carrot (Queen Anne's lace) is the host plant for the caterpillars of the Old World swallowtail and grows at the border of the park. The nature reserve Freiburger Rieselfeld borders the district to the west and functions as a local recreation area for its residents.

== Famous people ==
- Bahar Kızıl, member of the former pop girl group Monrose, lives in Rieselfeld.
- Käthe Vordtriede, journalist, author and Jewish émigré, was honoured in Germany for the first time when a street was named after her in this district.
