= Budgong Sandstone =

Geologic formation in Australia

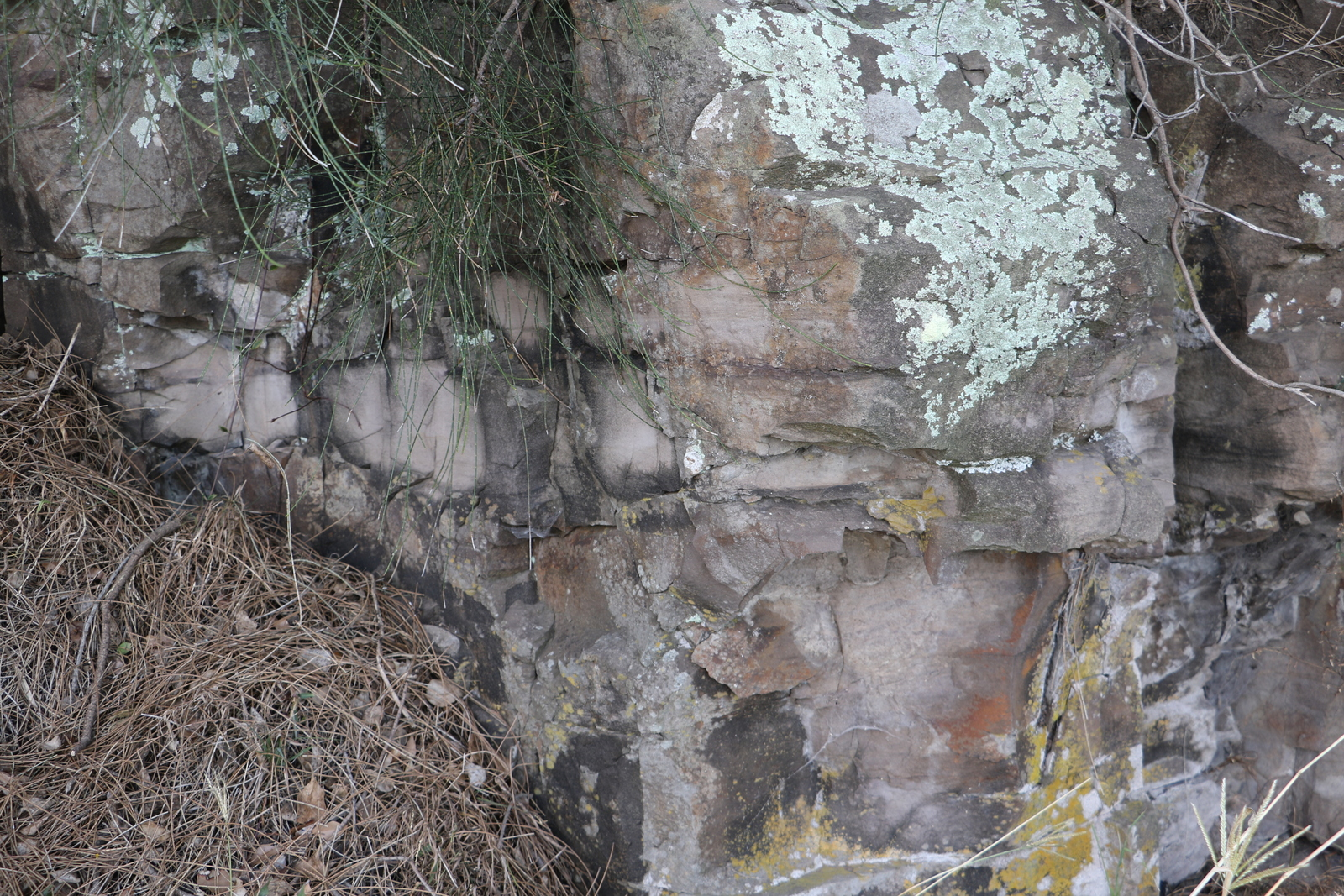
Budgong Sandstone, exposed near Lake Illawarra, Australia

Budgong Sandstone is a lithic sedimentary rock occurring in the Sydney Basin in eastern Australia. This stratum is up to 370 metres thick. Formed in the Late Permian, it consists mostly of tuffaceous material from local Illawarra volcanic rocks. Budgong Sandstone is reddish brown to grey in colour. It creates soils which are associated with rainforest vegetation.

== See also ==
- Sydney Basin
- Bald Hill Claystone
- Narrabeen group
