= Haslach (Freiburg) =

Coordinates: 47°59′26″N 7°49′13″E

Haslach (German pronunciation: [ˈhaslax]), incorporated into the city on 1 January 1890, is one of the Western districts of Freiburg im Breisgau. After the demerging of Weingarten the district is made up out of the boroughs 611 Haslach-Egerten, 612 Haslach-Gartenstadt, 613 Haslach-Schildacker and 614 Haslach-Haid. Its population is 20,939 (2020).

== Geography ==
In the North Haslach is bordered by the Dreisam opposite the neighbouring district Stühlinger, in the east by the Rheintal-railway (Karlsruhe-Basel) opposite the district Wiehre. Westward it is bordered by freight train railway and Opfingerstraße opposite Weingarten as well as by Besançonallee. In the South the district borders at Sankt Georgen through Guildfordallee and Wiesentalstraße.

== Etymology ==
The name "Haslach" comes from the Old German words "Hasala" meaning hazel bush and "Aha" meaning stream. However, hazel bushes have nowadays become rare at the village creek.

== History ==
Haslach was first mentioned in a document in the year 786. The document, a deed of donation, transferred ownership of some land from Heimo and his daughter Svanahilt to the Abbey of Saint Gall, including Haslach (then called Haslaha). Because there are no earlier mentions in records there is no way of telling how old Haslach really is, but it is clear that it was established sometime before 786.

In 1120 the city of Freiburg was established close by. This influenced the development of Haslach a lot. Especially the market in Freiburg advanced the economic situation of Haslach.

The parish of Haslach was first mentioned in records in 1261. Today's parish church St. Michael was built in 1909 and was extended several times.

During the Thirty Years' War (1618–1648) Haslach was destroyed completely in 1633.

The extension of Haslach consisting of residential subdivisions for workers began under the Lord Mayor of Freiburg Otto Winterer (term in office from 1888 to 1913) after the annexation of Haslach in 1890. During that time the garden city of Haslach which was inspired by the Garden city movement of Ebenezer Howard came into existence. This neighbourhood with its terraced houses and the appendant large gardens which were intended for the self-sufficiency of the inhabitants nowadays has a landmark status. This development influences Haslach up to the present day.

Since the 1960s, Haslach has developed into a residential area, a development that started in the 1960s. Today Haslach has several schools, a swimming centre, Kindergarten, several shops and other amenities. Haslach is also served by busses and trams.

The Haslacher Dorfbrunnen (Haslach's village well) was donated by the city of Freiburg in 1892 as a reminder of the annexation of Haslach. The well has three sides because at that point three roads from Freiburg, St. Georgen and Opfingen met. On the well column there is the crest of Haslach as well as an eagle. Below the basin there are three inscriptions:

- "Vereinigung Haslach mit Freiburg 1890” (Annexation of Haslach to Freiburg 1890)
- "Errichtung des Brunnens 1892” (Construction of the Well 1892)
- "Zuführung der Wasserleitung 1894” (Construction of the water supply line 1894)

The cobbled area around the well was originally in the shape of a triangle, but was rounded to the side of Gutleutstraße in 1908 due to the increasing traffic. In 1969 the well was moved to its present position at the crossing of Carl-Kistner-Straße and Uffhauserstraße because it stood in the way of the broadening of Carl-Kistner-Straße and Markgrafenstraße.

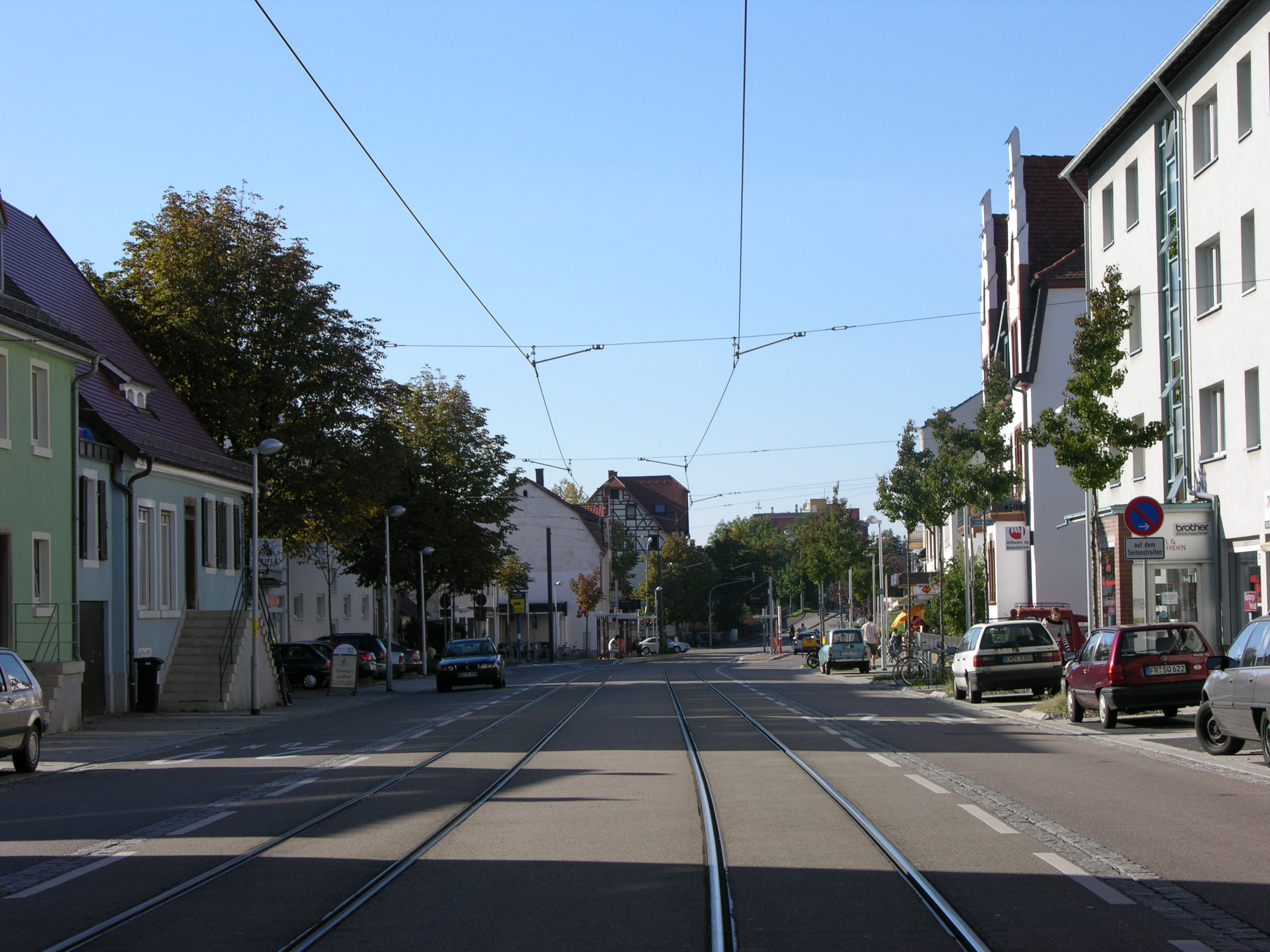
Carl-Kistner-Straße: The center of Haslach

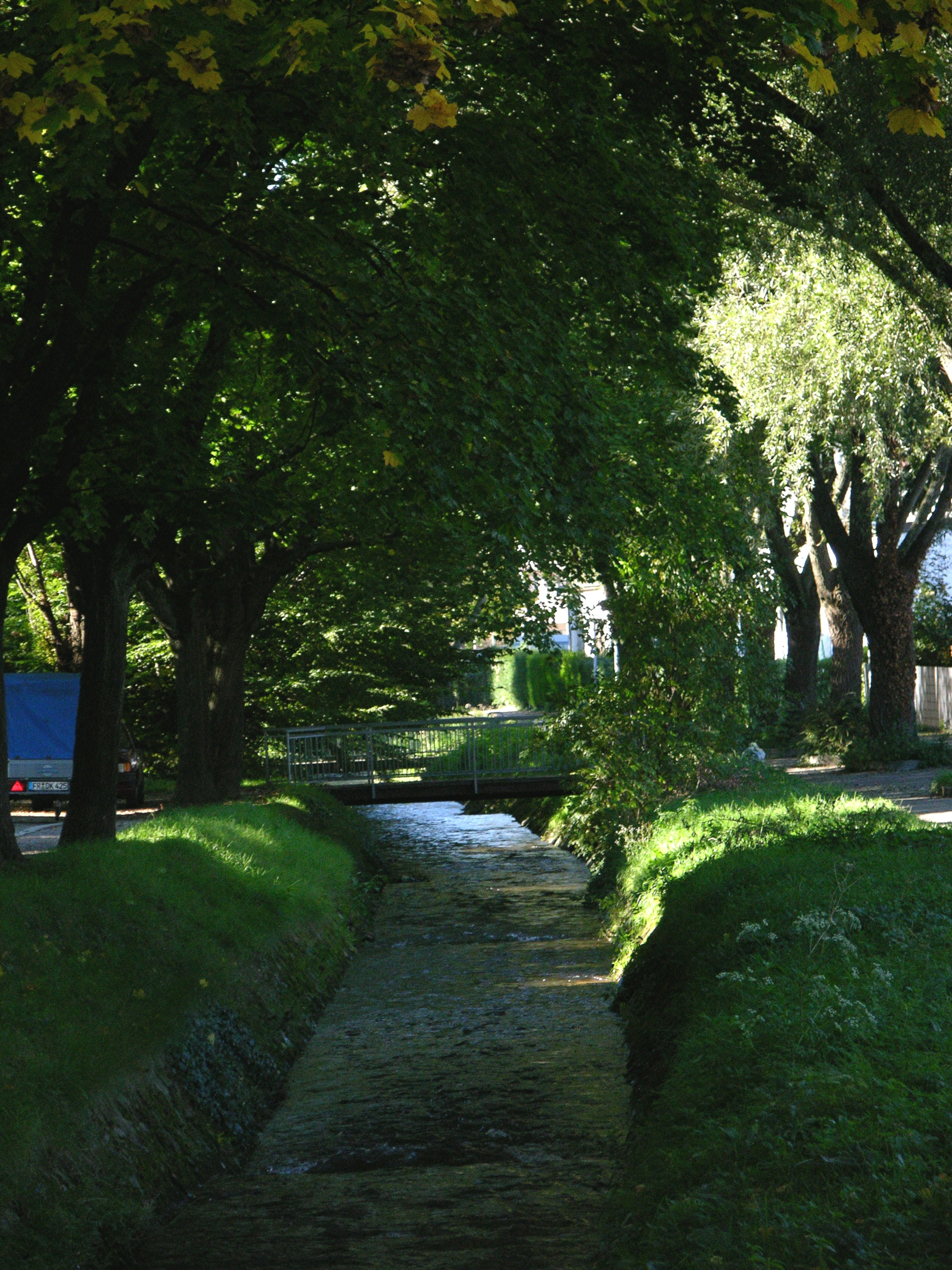
Am Dorfbach

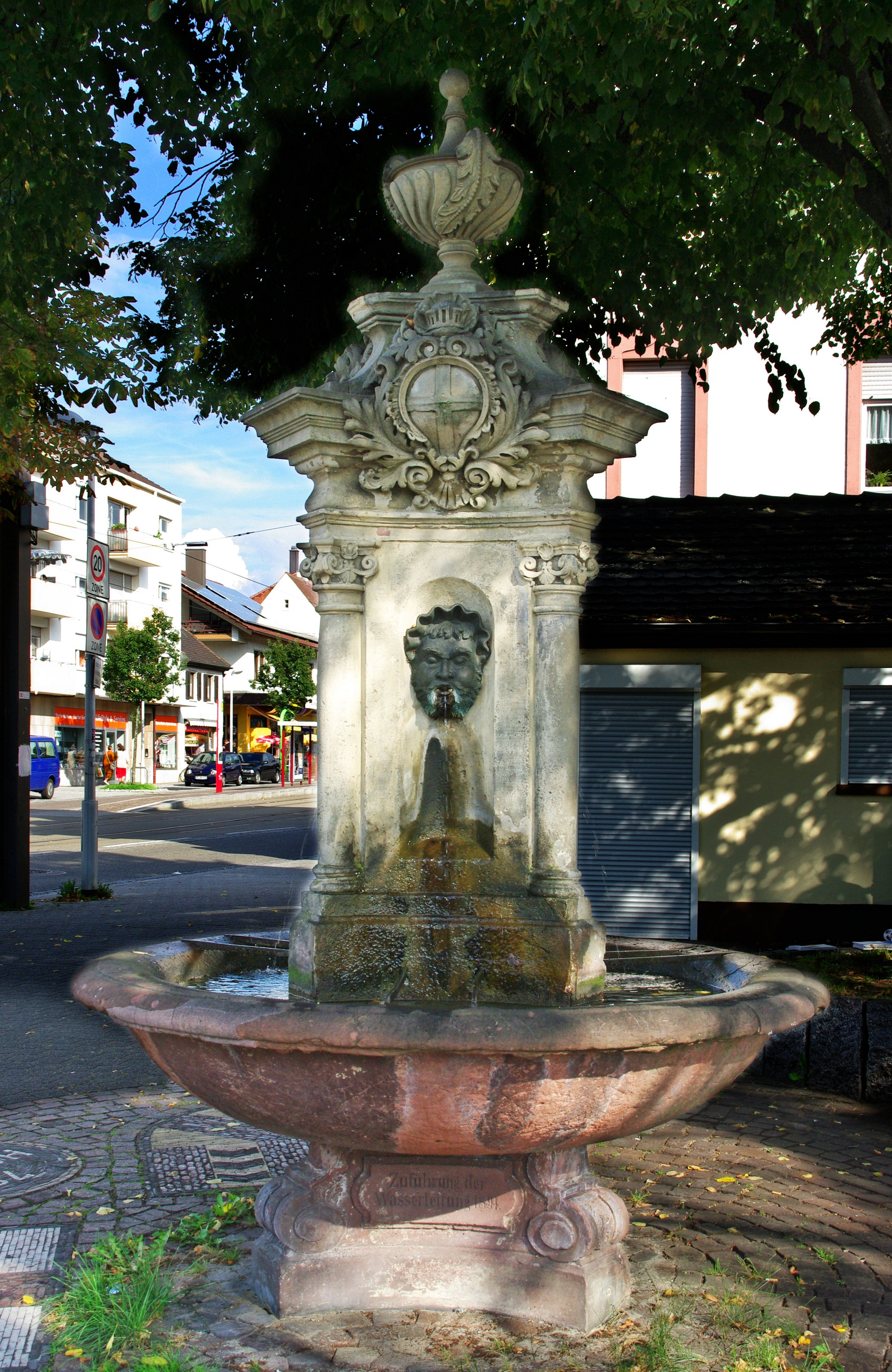
The village fountain, founded after the connection Haslach to the water network of Freiburg

== Public Facilities ==
The main building of the Freiburg Fire Department (Feuerwehr Freiburg im Breisgau) is located at the Eschholzstraße in Haslach. It does not only house the professional fire brigade but also the volunteers, the office for fire and catastrophe protection, as well as the integrated control station. From the 17 departments of volunteers, the division Unterstadt (Haslach, Unterwiehre, Vauban and Merzhausen) is responsible for the biggest part of the city. Haslach also has Freiburg's only comprehensive school (Gesamtschule), that is named after Nobel prize winner Hermann Staudinger. The building was built in 1970 and is planned to make space for a more modern building until 2025. South of the school there has been the Haslach indoor garden pool since 1976. In Haslach-Schildacker an initial reception center for asylum applicants has been located since 2016 where the academy for the police of Baden-Württemberg used to be.
