= Studentenwerk =

Student affairs organisation in Germany

A Studentenwerk (plural: Studentenwerke) or Studierendenwerk is a state-run non-profit organization for student affairs in Germany. Each Studentenwerk is organized at the local level so that it covers one or more universities. The umbrella organization for the 58 local Studentenwerke is the German National Association for Student Affairs (Deutsches Studentenwerk – DSW), which was founded in 1921.

Studentenwerke provide public services for the economic, social, medical and cultural support for students enrolled at German universities. In particular, they run university cafeterias, dormitories, and provide the BAföG program to finance studies with grants and loans. The national association includes multiple stakeholders of German society and collaborates with other students' affairs organizations worldwide.

== History ==
Date	Event
1921	Founding of the self-help organization " Wirtschaftshilfe der Deutschen Studentenschaft e.V." in Tübingen, based in Dresden. It is supported by students, faculty and relevant personalities from the political, public and economic as friends and supporters of the universities. Adoption of the Erlanger program.
1922	Establishing the "Darlehenskasse der Deutschen Studentenschaft e.V." in Dresden and the associated funding support for advanced students.
1923/24	Construction of the first student houses in Bonn and Aachen, Dresden and Munich. This student houses have not only practical functions, such as Providing rooms for the cafeteria, they should also serve cultural activities.
1927	The Association of German universities founded in Dresden a "Deutsche Akademische Auslandsstelle". It is closely connected to the economic support of the German student body. With the help of the local economy is an attempt to support foreign students at universities and help them to become familiar with conditions in Germany.
1925–1931	1925 "Akademische Austauschdienst e.V." in Heidelberg was founded, who moved his office to Berlin in the same year. 1931, both where combined to the " Deutschen Akademischen Austauschdienst" (DAAD), headquartered in Berlin.
1929	Name change to „Deutsches Studentenwerk e.V.“
from 1933	Cooptation of the Deutsches Studentenwerk e.V.: dissolution of legally independent local student unions, transfer as a dependent part of the institutions in 1934 by decree of the Minister of Science, Education and National Education, Bernhard Rust, built "Reichsstudentenwerk” located in Berlin.
1945–1949	Refoundation of Studentenwerken at the West German universities and in West Berlin
1950	The local Studentenwerke join in Marburg together to the "Verband Deutscher Studentenwerke e.V.".
1956	Reorganization of the umbrella association in "Deutsches Studentenwerk".
1957	The forerunner of today's BAföGs is introduced
1962	In Bochum Mensaplan a cheapening of canteens for students is recommended for the first time. Students should pay only the cost of the true use, but not the costs of the preparation.
1969–1975	Conversion of most local Studentenwerke in national institutions under public law. Entry into force of the Bundesausbildungsförderungsgesetzes (BAföG). The Studentenwerke are responsible for the implementation.
1982	Establishment of the Federal Minister of Education and Science funded counseling center for handicapped university applicants and students at the German Studentenwerk in Bonn.
1990	Formation of partnerships between Studentenwerken in the Federal Republic of Germany and the emerging Studentenwerken in the GDR.
1991	During the 70-year celebration in Dresden: Admission of Studentenwerke Chemnitz, Cottbus, Dresden, Freiberg, Greifswald, Halle, Leipzig, Magdeburg, Potsdam, Rostock, Thuringia and Zwickau in the German Studentenwerk.
1999	Official founding of the European Council for Student Affairs (ECStA) under Belgian law with headquarters in Brussels. Its goal is to improve the social infrastructure at universities in Europe and to promote cooperation between institutions that are active in this field. The German Studentenwerk provides the secretariat, Director of ECStA is the General Secretary of the German Studentenwerk.
2000	The German Studentenwerk is co-organizer of the European Cultural Festival in Kraków (Poland).

== Tasks ==
Studentenwerke fulfill the following tasks:

- running 875 university cafeterias
- running and administering dormitories
- running the BAföG program combining grants and loans to finance studies for less wealthy students
- support for international students in Germany
- psychological counselling and advisory services on legal and financial issues

The umbrella organization Deutsches Studentenwerk is active in:

- carrying their know-how into policy making on the federal and state levels
- providing general support and advice to local Studentenwerke, including seminars, conferences, training manuals, publications, professional training
- engages in lobbying and advocacy efforts
- defends the interests of students at universities in social policy
- collaborating with institutions and organisations which share the same goals

== National Association ==
According to the statutes, Deutsches Studentenwerk has three bodies: the general assembly, the executive board, and the Secretary General. There is also a Board of Trustees (Kuratorium), which is composed of the German Rectors' Conference, students, representatives of federal and regional government, the German Cities Association (Deutscher Städtetag), unions and employers as well as members of parliament and other public figures. The States' Council (Länderrat) consults the executive board and the Secretary General in all matters of fundamental importance. The students council (Studierendenrat), established in May 2004, also plays an important role. It is composed of student members who are actively involved in the bodies of local Studentenwerke. In addition to this, there are nine committees on specific subjects which consult the association.

== International Relations ==
The German National Association for Student Affairs (Deutsches Studentenwerk) strives for higher education to be a "tolerant, open and culturally diverse higher education area", in which the social and economic well-being of students is guaranteed by the "European model of strong, public, autonomous and non-profit student affairs and services".

The growing internationalization of the European Higher Education Area (EHEA) involves not only research and teaching, but also involves the understanding that excellent social and economic living conditions for all students is a precondition for successful learning. It also requires broad access to higher education for all social groups in a society of knowledge. Therefore, the Deutsches Studentenwerk is working towards free, democratic and accessible higher education for everyone regardless of social background or nationality. The international and intercultural activities of DSW intend to create a free exchange of experience, mutual learning and to create new knowledge in all important areas of student affairs.

Establishing and developing relationships with partner organisations abroad, including the exchange of information and experience with these organisations is a core commitment of Deutsches Studentenwerk. DSW cooperates with numerous partner organisations abroad. For more than 40 years, close relations have been maintained with partners in France, Italy, and Poland. On the European level, Deutsches Studentenwerk works closely with the organisations that are united in the European Council for Student Affairs (ECStA). Overseas, it cooperates with NASPA in North America and the Japanese National Federation of University Co-operative Associations. The development of collaboration with countries that have recently joined the European Union or are candidates to accession is another core task in international relations.

=== European Council for Student Affairs ===
Deutsches Studentenwerk is a founding member of the European Council of Student Affairs (ECStA), the European umbrella group founded in 1999. ECStA's goal is to improve the social infrastructure at higher education institutions and to support cooperation between organisations that are active in this field. With its actions, ECStA aims to support student mobility for participants of exchange programs and for free movers, who are organising and financing their studies abroad themselves.

The focus of ECStA's work lies on study financing, housing, food, counselling and cultural activities of students. Apart from this, the Council organises conferences and seminars, carries out research projects, and arranges exchange projects for students and staff. Finally, ECStA works as a consulting body for the institutions of the European Union as well as for national governments in all questions regarding the social framework of studying.
