= Zähringen (Freiburg) =

Coordinates: 48.0239°N 7.8633°E

Zähringen (German pronunciation: [ˈtsɛːʁɪŋən]) is the northernmost suburb of Freiburg im Breisgau in Baden-Württemberg, Germany. Its population is 9,196 (2020).

== History ==
On September 30, 1008 Henry II issued a deed of donation with which he ceded his exclusive hunting rights (hunting privilege) in the Breisgau forests to the bishop of Basel. Although the village must already have existed for quite some time, this is the first official document in which it is mentioned.

On January 1, 1906, Zähringen was incorporated into Freiburg.

== Reutebach ==
Reutebach is one of the names of the stream running through Zähringen. The word beginning Reute refers to cleared or deforested land and the ending Bach means stream. Other names of this stream are Altbach (old stream) and Dorfbach (village stream).

Reutebach was also the name of a former village which seems to have been larger than Zähringen, as its church was the parish church for the villages Gundelfingen, Heuweiler, Wildtal and Zähringen. Most of its former territory now belongs to Zähringen. Only the Reutebach farms (Reutebacher Höfe) belong to Gundelfingen.

== Zähringen castle ==
Zähringen castle, the ancestral seat of the Zähringer, is located above Zähringen, within the boundary of Gundelfingen.
