= Mooswald (Freiburg im Breisgau) =

Mooswald (German pronunciation: [ˈmoːsvalt]) is a district in the western part of Freiburg im Breisgau, Germany, which consists of the two districts Mooswald West (521) and Mooswald East (522). Its population is 9,223 (2020). In the North East, Mooswald borders the district of Brühl, with its airfield, the university campus of the technical faculty and the exhibition centre. Mooswald further borders the district of Landwasser in the North West, the district of Stühlinger in the East and the district of Betzenhausen with the Seepark in the South West. Mooswald is separated from Brühl by the Breisgau S-Bahn, from Landwasser by the Westrandstraße (Paduaallee/Mooswaldallee) and from Stühlinger by the railway tracks of the freight railway.

== History ==
In 1932, the city council of Freiburg decided on the construction of a suburban settlement at the former western border of the city, the Mooswald, after the government of the German Reich decided on an unemployment programme in 1931, in times of high unemployment. The houses were mostly built independently by the settlers and could be purchased as leasehold estates. After 1933 the project was continued as "Nationalsozialistisches Siedlungswerk" (Nazi settlement). In 1934, a settler union was established. The simple houses had neither electricity nor gas nor a connection to the sewage system at the beginning (until the end of the 1930s). At the beginning, the water supply was achieved with pump wells on the properties. Big gardens enabled the self-sufficiency of the settlers with the cultivation of potatoes and vegetables, and allowed the keeping of small animals. In 1938, the Catholic Church's Holy Family was built in this region. During the air raid on Freiburg in November 1944, 80% of the district was destroyed. In 1945, active reconstruction work with simple means started. In 1948, the station "Im Wolfswinkel" was established at the railway line to Breisach (since then, the station has been closed down). In 1952, today's civic association, Mooswald e.V., was founded. The city of Freiburg established a landfill site in the nearby "Wolfswinkel". In 1953, the Evangelic St. Mark Church was built as an emergency church. The district received a primary school with the Mooswald school in 1955/56, and a community house was completed.

After the end of World War II, the preservation of the western part of the Mooswald was a permanent topic for the inhabitants of the district of Mooswald, since the forest became affected more and more by the city's expansion to the west.

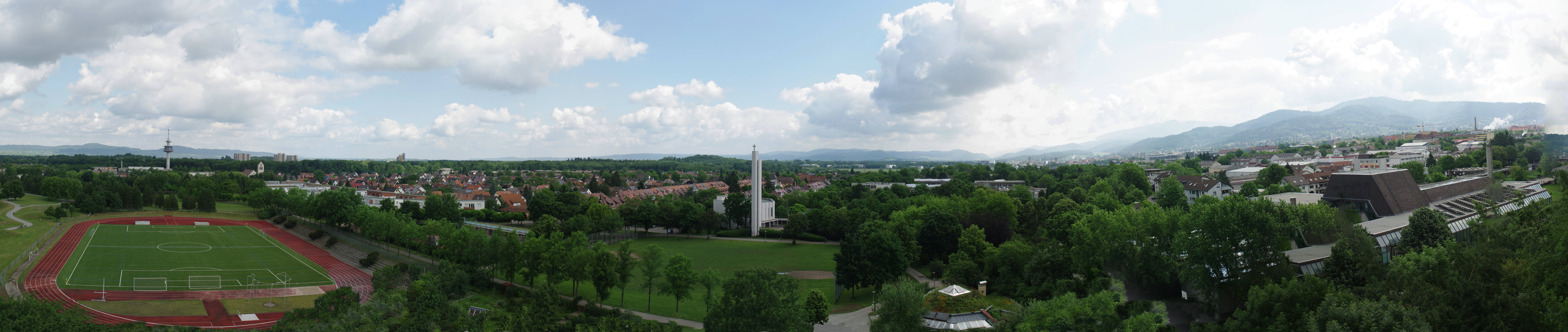
View of Mooswald from the viewing tower in the Seepark Betzenhausen, in the middle of the picture is the St. Mark's Church.

== Buildings and institutions ==
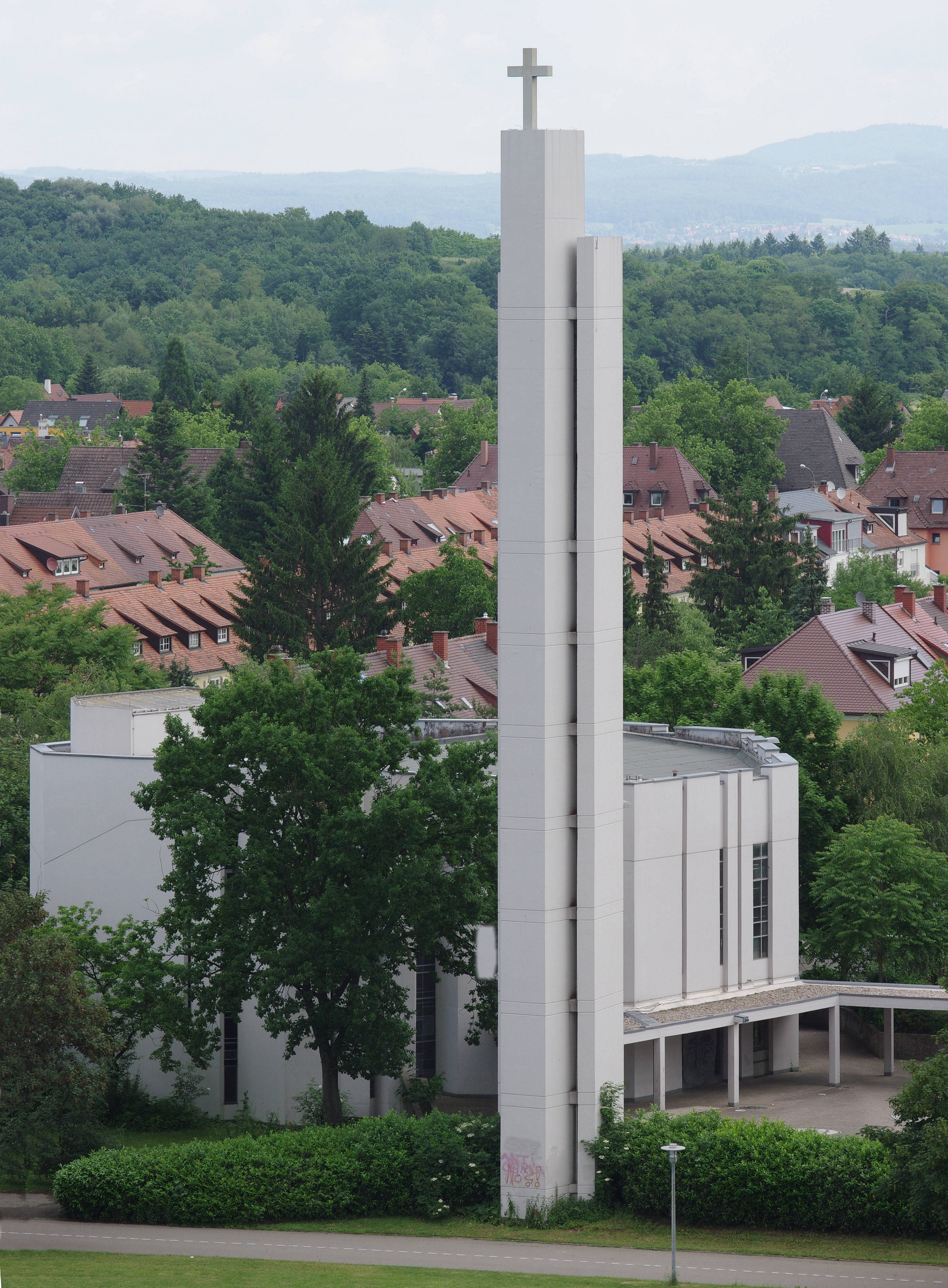
St. Mark's Church

There are two churches in this district: the "Holy Family" Catholic Church and St. Mark's Church (Evangelical). Moreover, the Jewish cemetery of Freiburg is situated there. There are various schools in the district of Mooswald: the Paul Hindemith primary school, the Wentzinger schools (middle school and grammar school), and the Mooswaldschule, which nowadays is a school for educational aids.

A meeting centre for young and old is the Fritz Hüttinger Haus, which is managed by the civic association Mooswald and whose rooms are used for cultural events, language courses, or as a meeting point for the youth.

The western Mooswälder forests and the Seepark lying in the southwest of Freiburg in the district of Betzenhausen provide relaxation opportunities.

The Breisacher Hof is a housing estate in the former Gallwitz barracks, which is on the move. Early in 2017, the city announced that the football ground there is to be developed into 60 socially funded tenement flats by 2020. In 2013, the "Westarkaden", a shopping centre, was completed. More tenement flats are under construction.

Quite striking is a radio tower of the German Telecom near the Paduaallee.

== Transport ==
The construction work of the tram line 4 to "Messe" began in 2013. On 11 December 2015, the first section of the tramway towards the temporary terminus Technische Fakultät became operational. By 2018, the last kilometer of tracks in the direction of "Messe" should be finished. The Breisgau-S-Bahn Freiburg-Breisach serves the stop Neue Messe/Universität. The main road in Freiburg is Elsässerstraße on which the Freiburger Verkehrs AG (VAG) line 10 bus operates. Four-lane highways in the west of the city (Paduaallee) and the east of the city (Berliner Allee) make the district easily accessible for cars.
