= Seepark Betzenhausen =

Coordinates: 48.0113°N 7.8182°E

The Seepark is a park in the district Betzenhausen of Freiburg im Breisgau which was constructed for the Landesgartenschau in 1986. It is a local recreation area, covering 35 hectares, and contains the Flückigersee, an artificial lake which takes up about 10 hectares. In the northeastern part of the park is the 15-meter tall Seepark Tower.

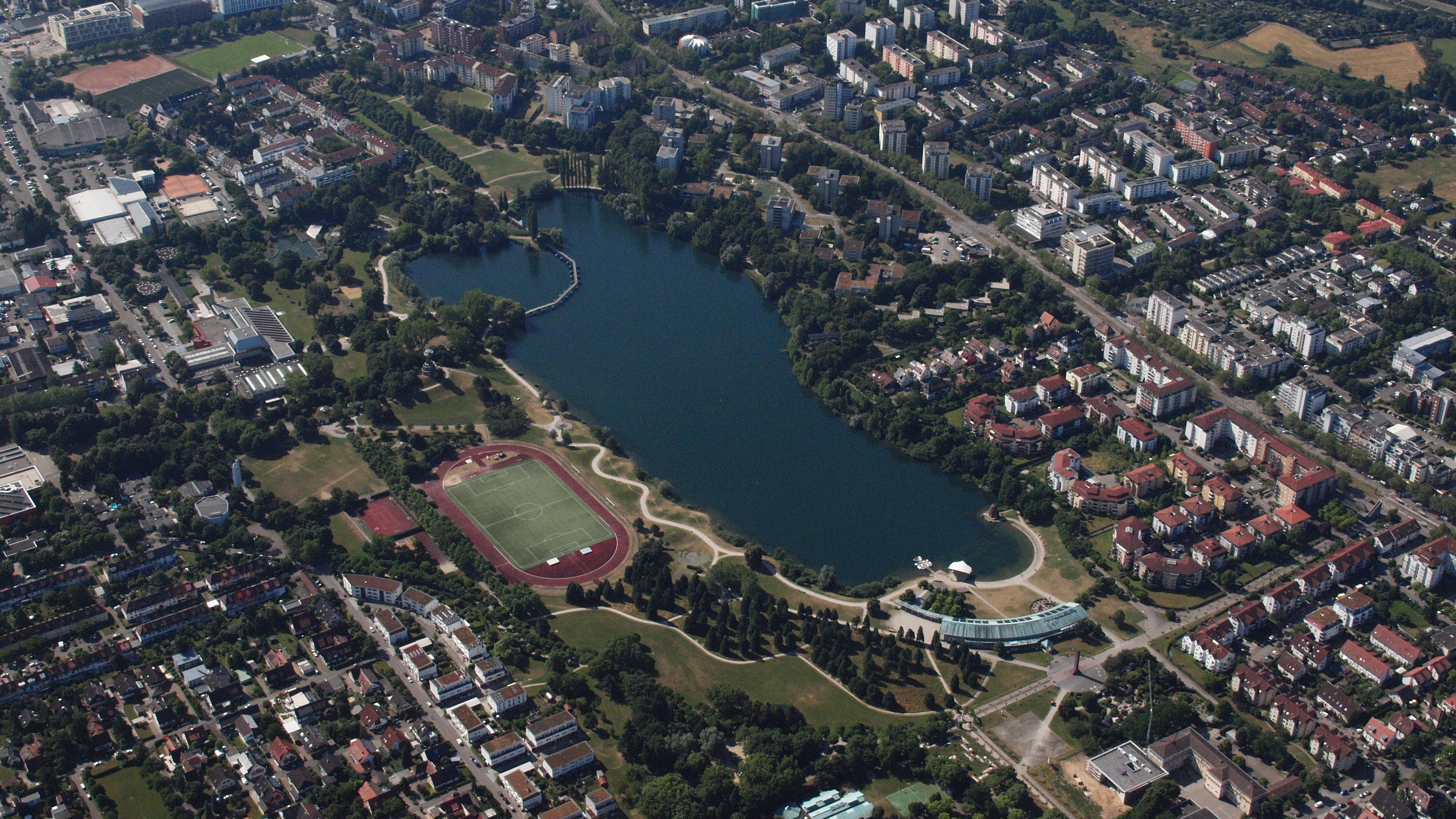
Seepark Betzenhausen, Flückigersee

The area now taken up by the Seepark used to be used for agriculture. However, the soil was not well-suited for growing good grain. In the 1920s, the company Flückiger started removing sand and gravel from the grounds. In the 1970s, Flückiger's operation ended, in order for the area to be used as a parking lot.

In 1986, the successful application to hold the Landesgartenschau in Freiburg led to the redesign of the grounds, leaving the park in its current form. The Landesgartenschau had roughly two million visitors.

In 1990, the park was expanded to include a 3600 m² Japanese garden to the West of the park, as part of a partnership with the Japanese city Matsuyama.

In the eastern part of the park is a rose garden, which was added in 2011. It was named the Eugen Martin Anlage after the founder and citizen of honor, Eugen Theodor Martin.

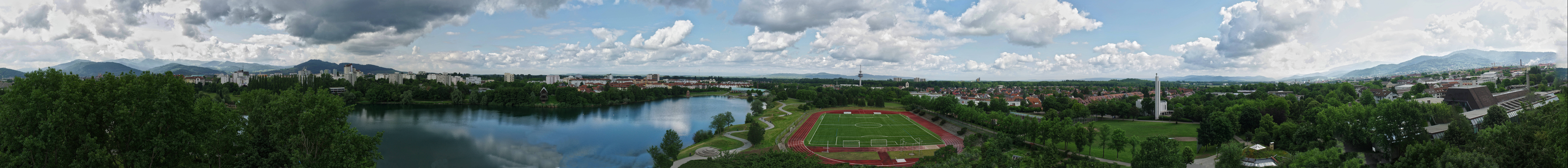
360° Panorama from the platform of the Seepark tower. Left in the foreground Betzenhausen, the Seepark in the middle, and the Mooswald (Freiburg im Breisgau) to the right
