= Weingarten (Freiburg im Breisgau) =

Municipal district in Freiburg im Breisgau, Germany

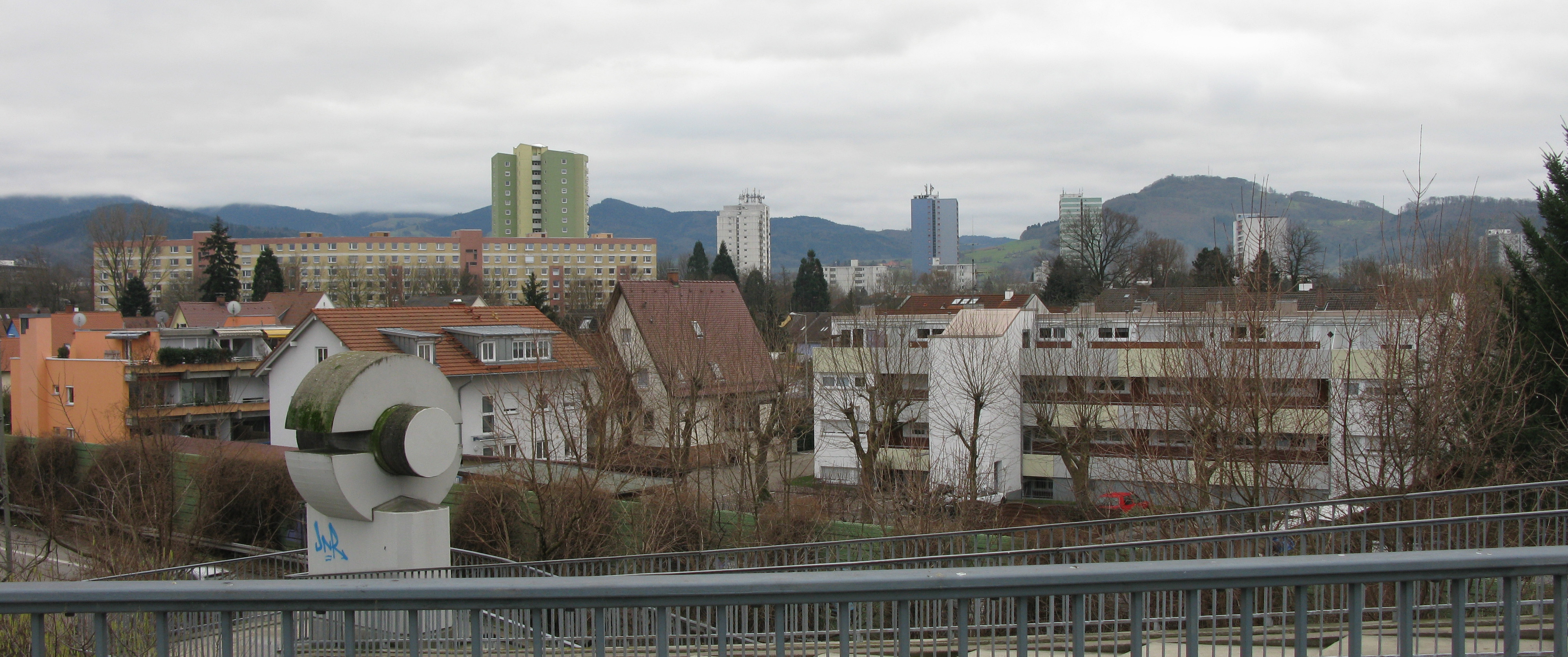
Weingarten

Weingarten (German pronunciation: [ˈvaɪnɡaʁtn̩]) is a municipal district of the city of Freiburg im Breisgau, Germany. In the north, it is separated by the river Dreisam from the district Betzenhausen, in the east beyond the rail tracks lies Haslach and in the south, separated by the Opfinger Road, the district Haslach-Haid. In the west, the new district Rieselfeld borders Weingarten.

Weingarten was established by the Freiburger Stadtbau company between 1964-66. There are 11,263 inhabitants living in this district (2020). It is characterised by various residential tower blocks and the high percentage of foreigners compared to the rest of Freiburg, with 48.2% of inhabitants having a migration background.

== Public institutions ==
=== Churches ===
The Catholic Church of St. Andrew was built in 1968/69. The church community was founded in 1975. After a fire, the interior was renovated and re-designed between 1992/94. The Evangelical Christians belong to the Dietrich Bonhoeffer community. Additionally, there is a New Apostolic Church.

=== Nursery schools ===
The district has various care facilities for pre-school children:

- two under the sponsorship of the Workers' Welfare Association,
- three under Evangelical sponsorship,
- one under Catholic sponsorship and
- one municipal institution.

In the House Weingarten there is a school nursery school, which closely cooperates with the Adolf Reichwein School, a school for children with learning difficulties.

=== Schools ===
The Adolf Reichwein School, named after the honomynous poet Adolf Reichwein, is a school association of a primary school and a special school. Currently around 380 children attend this school in 16 classes and two classes designed for children who have reached school age but who are considered to be lacking in the skills required for normal school attendance. The pupils of the special school are educated inclusively in primary school classes. They receive additional individual educational programmes and offers of support.

== Transport ==
Since March 1994 the district has been attached to the city's tram network. Both lines 3 (Vauban – Haid) and 5 (Rieselfeld – Zähringen) run through the district of Weingarten.

Via the road Besançonallee the district has good transport connections to the slip road Freiburg-Mitte and therefore to the motorway 5.

== Additional information ==
- In the district there is a large adult meeting centre.
- The grounds of the Evangelical university lie in the district Weingarten.
- The Dietenbachpark with its 3 hectares of lake (230m above sea level), sports facilities and an adventure play park is a recreational area for the district
- The Audioguide of Weingarten allows visitors to listen to stories told by residents.
