= Green spaces in Freiburg =

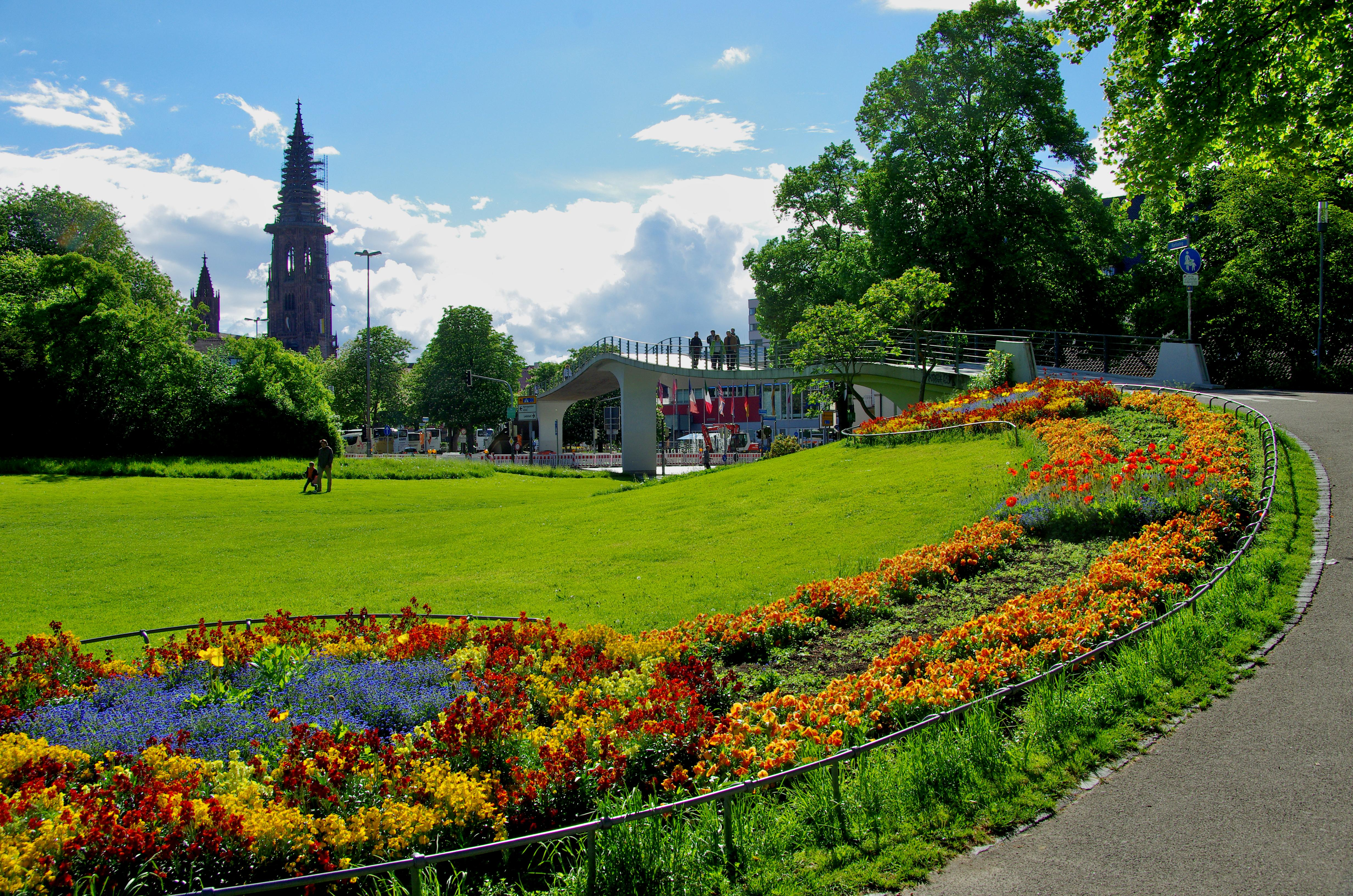
Park with view of the Karlssteg and the Munster of Freiburg

Freiburg im Breisgau's parks, green spaces, recreational facilities, playgrounds, roadside greeneries and the Mundenhof add up to an area of 397 hectares (980 acres), which corresponds to 18.05 square metres (194.3 sq ft) of green space per Freiburg citizen. On average, major cities in Baden-Württemberg have 22.66 square metres (243.9 sq ft) of green space per citizen. However, there is an area of 2,600 hectares (6,400 acres) of forest in the proximity of Freiburg as well as additional recreational area like the Rieselfeld district (a former sewage farm). The majority of the green spaces came into existence from the 1960s on.

== Parks ==
=== Dietenbachpark ===
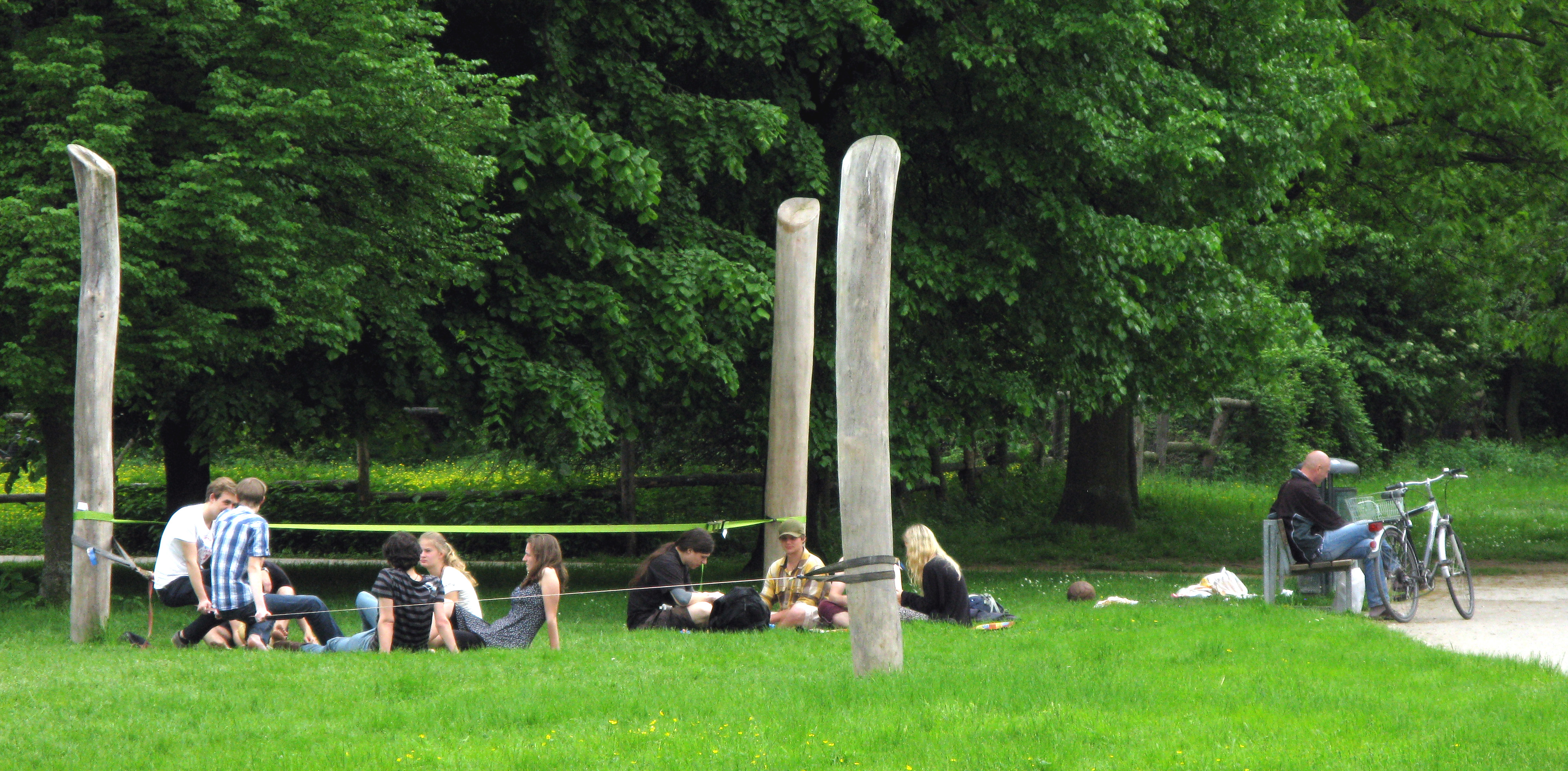
Slackline facility in the Dietenbachpark

In 1974, the construction of the Dietenbachpark, which is located on the outskirts of the Weingarten district, was started. However, the park was not finished until 1986. Extending over an area of 34.88 hectares (86.2 acres), Dietenbachpark is Freiburg's largest park. Inside the park, lake Dietenbachsee is located, which was the direct result of gravel extraction for the construction of the street Westrandstraße. Using the earth that covered the gravel and hence had to be removed, an embankment was raised on the northern side of the lake. One of its purposes is to protect the small stream Dietenbach, that had been re-natured during the course of the construction, from being completely absorbed by the lake in the case of a flood. During summertime, the lake can be used for swimming (with nude swimming being permitted).

There are several plants growing in the park, including fruit trees, dog roses, margarites, medick, and knautia. These plants attract several butterflies, including the many-plumed moth, the painted lady, and Lycaenidae.

There is a cross of 4 metres (13 ft) height, which can be seen afar, on the southern side of the lake. The word "peace" is engraved in the base of the cross in twelve different languages. The placement of the cross was arranged by an ecumenical initiative. Among other things, it represents the many different cultures living in Freiburg-Weingarten. Public sports grounds as well as sports clubs such as Sportgruppe Weingarten and Freiburger FC can be found in the park as well as playgrounds and a barbecue area.

In the summer of 2012, a 72-year-old Freiburg citizen started growing a vegetable patch of approximately 15 square metres (160 sq ft). By now, this urban gardening has been accepted by the city of Freiburg.

=== Eschholzpark ===
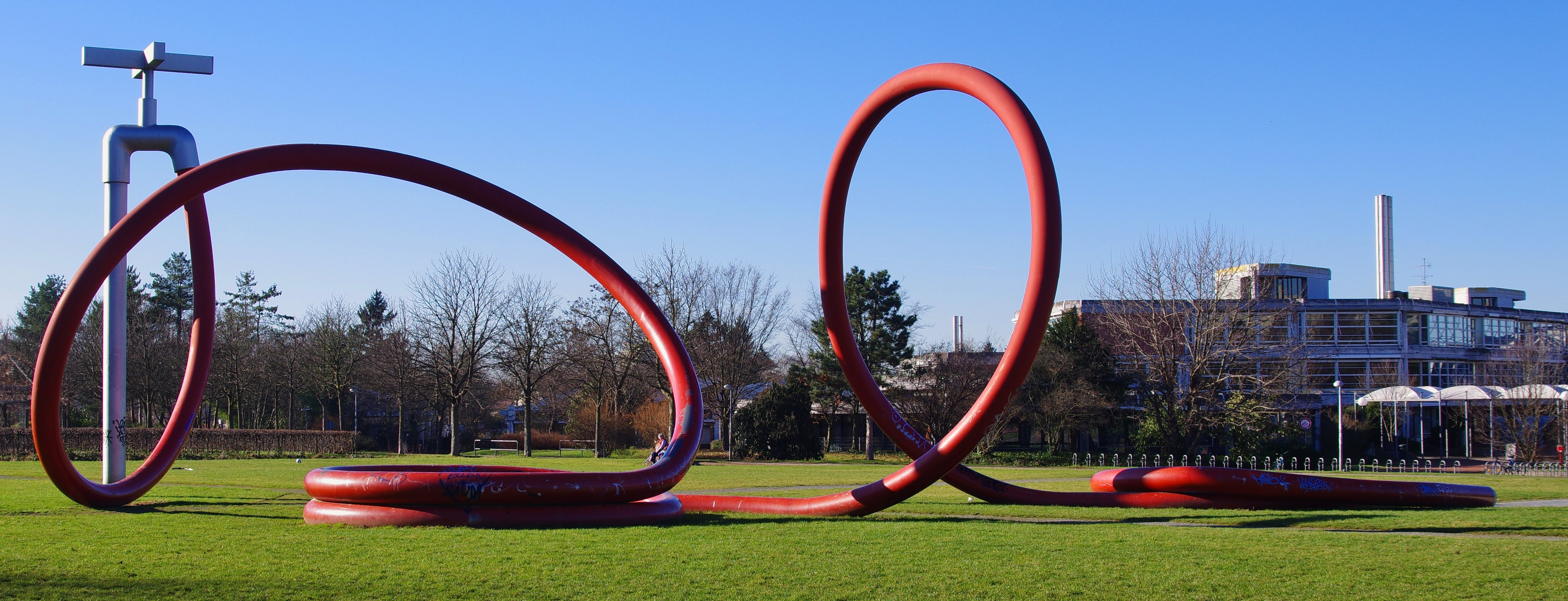
Red garden hose

Due to the construction of the Technisches Rathaus (technical town hall) and the construction of the school complex in the district Stühlinger, 370 community gardens were removed. Therefore, in 1979, the creation of the Eschholzpark was resolved and in 1982, the park was inaugurated. The Eschholzpark covers an area of 375,000 square metres (4,040,000 sq ft) and is built in a block structure, which is a characteristic feature of the Stühlinger.

The most eye-catching element of the park is a huge sculpture which represents a water tap with a red garden hose. It was created by the winner of a competition, Claes Oldenburg, and is intended to remind of the removed community gardens. South of the meadow where the sculpture is located, there is a circular flower bed with a perennial garden, a pergola with wisteria and hedges. Both the meadow and the circular flower bed are surrounded by a chestnut-lined avenue. There is another meadow at the southern end of the park, which is spatially divided from the rest by a foot-and-cycle path. There, one can find a children's playground and a lawn for sunbathing and for other activities like slacklining.

The park was also used for events from the outset although there have been public protests against it. Therefore, in 1984, the Zelt-Musik-Festival was a one-off event in the Eschholzpark. In the late 1990s, the park served as an alternative venue of the Theater Freiburg during the reconstruction phase of its primary location near Bertoldstraße. During the FIFA World Cups in 2006 and 2010, the park served as a public viewing area for up to 10,000 visitors. An analogous event during the UEFA European Championship in 2012 was cancelled by the organizer. Since 2005, the vocational school Friedrich-Weinbrenner-Gewerbeschule has used the Eschholzpark as the location for the European Stone Festival, which takes place every three years.

=== Joseph-Brandel-Anlage ===
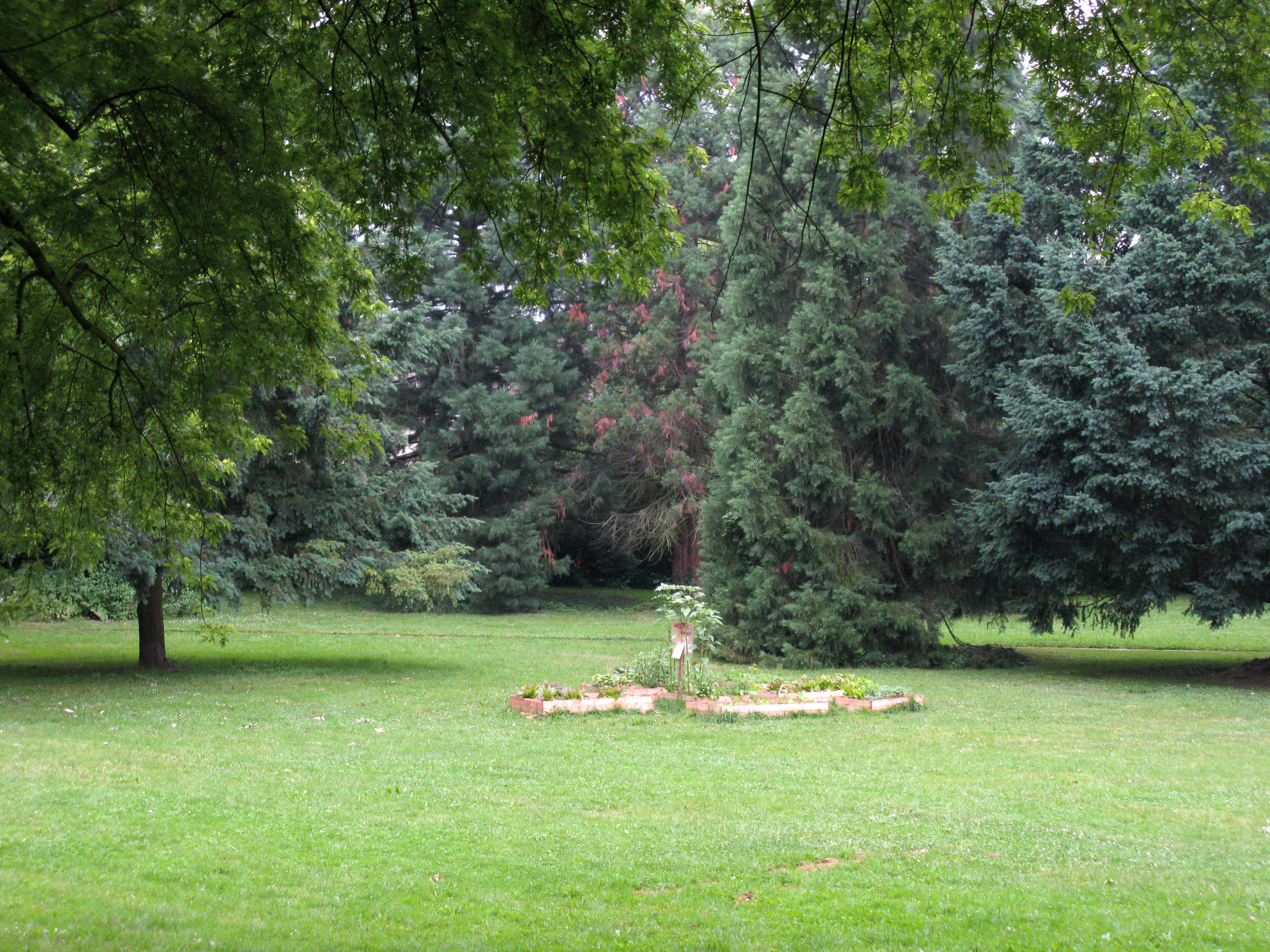
Urban gardening in the Josef-Brandel-Anlage

The Joseph-Brandel-Anlage is located in the Freiburg district of Haslach (close to the Guildfordallee) and is not well-known beyond Haslach's borders. Freiburg's lord mayor Joseph Brandel initiated the construction of the 43,500-square-metre (10.7-acre) Joseph-Brandel-Anlage, which was completed in the late 1960s. A memorial stone in the shape of a glacial mill, found by a business man in the Rhine close to Bad Säckingen, was set up to commemorate the former lord mayor. The estate features some valuable exotic tree species and a garden of perennials with seating facilities as well as two playgrounds, including one water playground. Many different footpaths and cycle paths lead through the Park and connect it via bridge with St. Georgen (another Freiburg district). Diverse artworks made out of stone and metal can be found in the northern part of the estate. In 2006, they were created by students of the Vigeliusschool in cooperation with the sculpture workshop Kunstflug.

=== Konrad-Guenther-Park ===
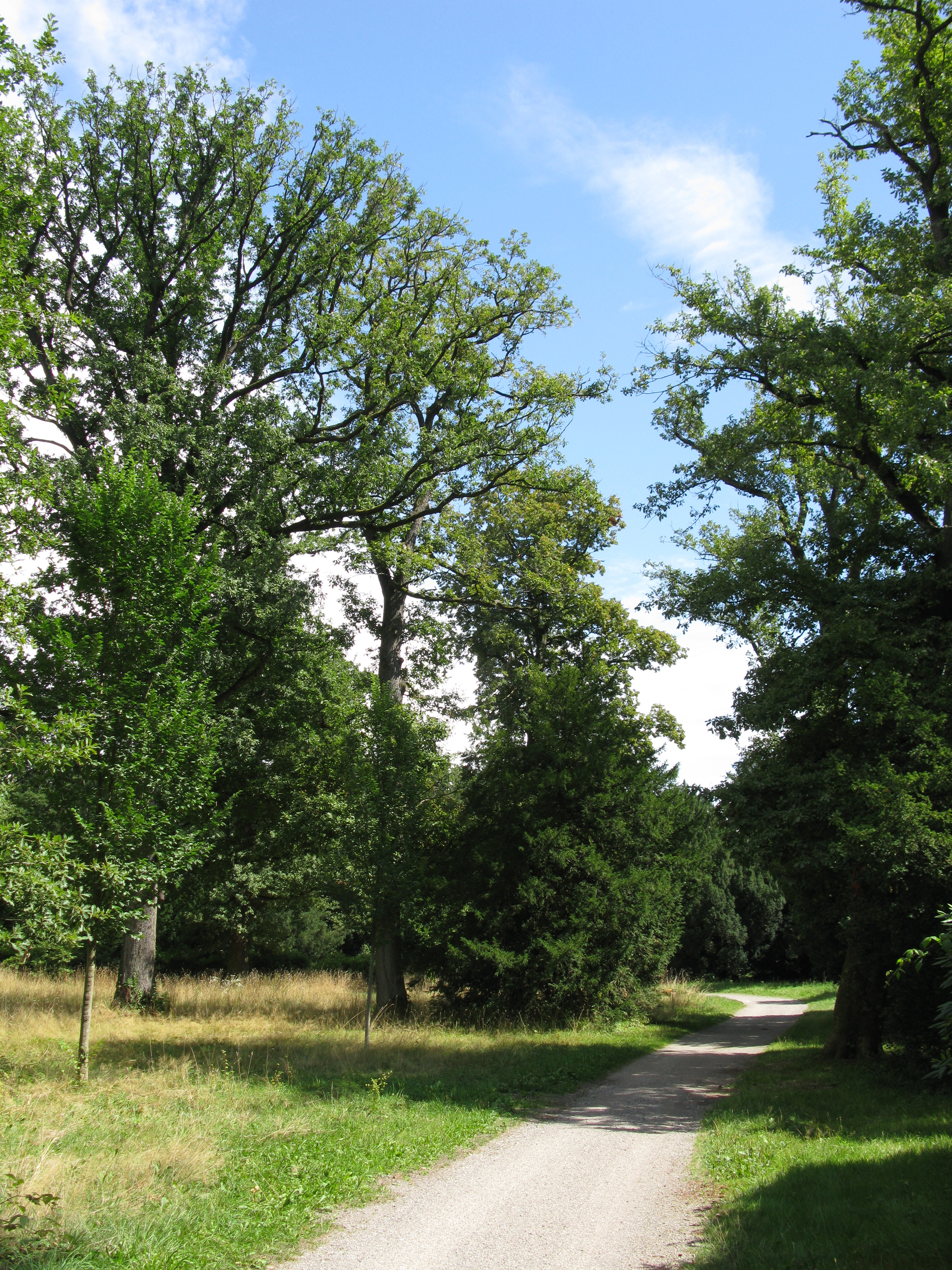
Konrad-Guenther-Park with oak trees

In 1934, the part of the Möslepark, which is situated north of the railway, was enlarged by an additional grove. This grove was later restructured into a natural reserve and, in 1954, named after the Freiburg zoologist Konrad Guenther. In 1996, countless old trees were cut down to make way for the construction of a new highway (B31 Ost) against fierce resistance from Freiburg's population. Since accidentally too many trees were cut down, the regional council was forced to pay the city of Freiburg a fee of €130,000. The money was used to finance the works in the Möslepark. Due to the construction of the highway, groundwater flows were disturbed, which resulted in the death of numerous trees. Even these dead trees are worth being preserved as they became a habitat for bats. Today the Konrad-Guenther-Park covers an area of 650,000 square metres (160 acres). The private school Kapriole is located at the verge of the park.

=== Möslepark with Waldsee ===
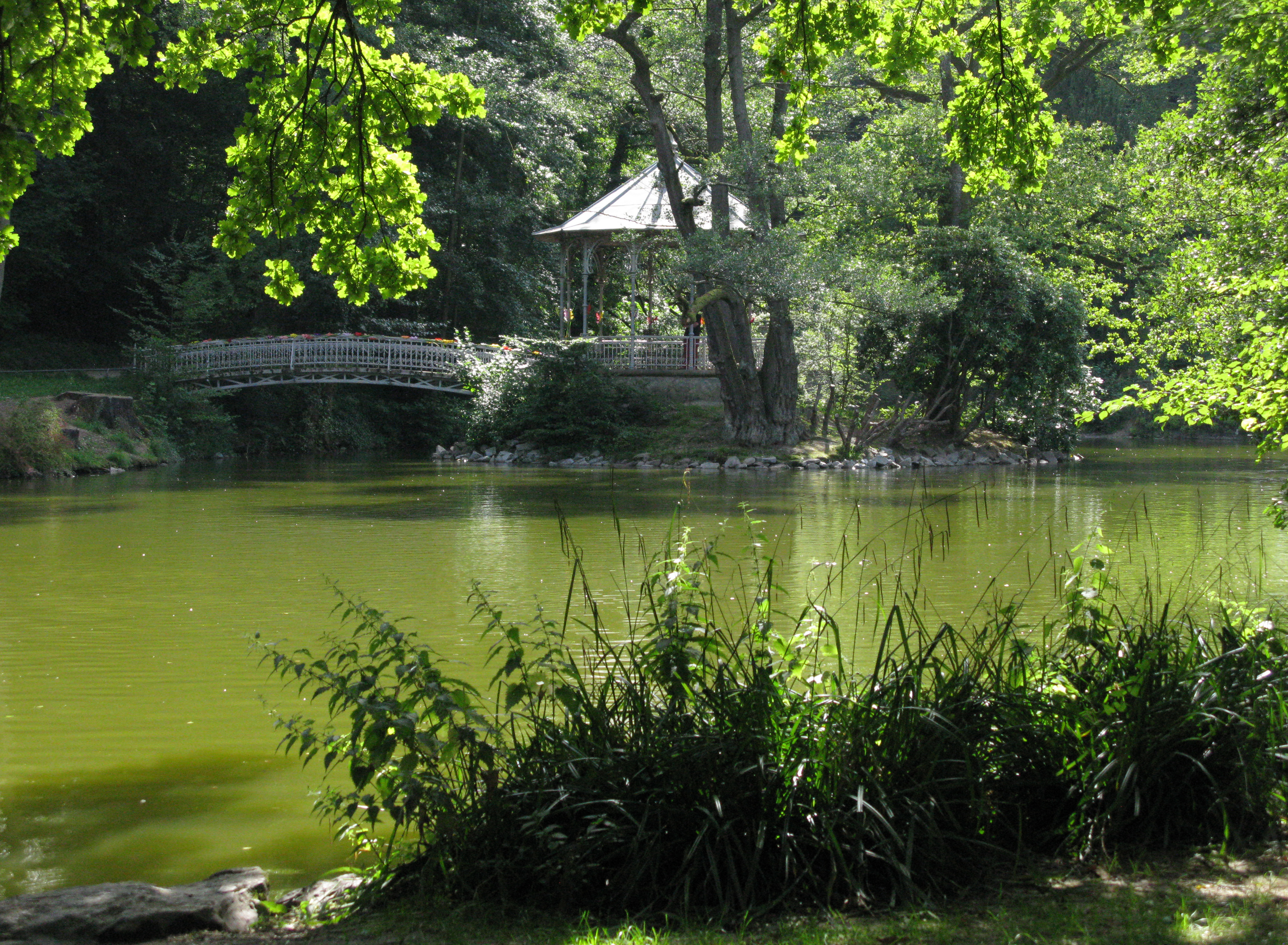
Waldsee with pavillon

The Möslepark, created as a landscape park between 1879 and 1885 under the plans of urban gardener Maximilian Wilhelm Schmöger, is one of the oldest parks in Freiburg. Initially, in 1877, two artificial ponds had been created south of the train tracks for the collection of ice by the brewery Neumeyer. (A former public house of the brewery can still be seen at the corner of Schwabentorring and Kartäuserstraße today.) The Society for Urban Beautification (Verein zur Verschönerung der Stadt), founded in 1873, suggested the creation of the park shortly afterwards. The park owes its name to its abundance of water. The oldest wellhouses of the city spring can be found here. In 1881, a third pond was created, which merged with the first two, and created the lake Waldsee as it is today. The Waldseerestaurant, which is situated on the western bank of the Waldsee, was founded in 1883 and features a terrace next to the lake. It is still a very popular vacation restaurant, as well as a place for local events. After the First World War, the extremely unkempt park, which covers an area of 11,000 square metres (2.7 acres), was thinned out and slightly remodeled. In 2015, the western part of the park was pruned, and in 2016 the eastern part will be as well, in order to restore the former variation of thick and light areas.

In the summer the Waldsee is used for boating, and in the winter it is used for skating. Since 1960, a so-called Jugendverkehrsschule, an institution for children and young adults to learn about traffic, has been located south of the Waldseestraße. Since 1956, the Waldseestraße has been closed to traffic due to toad migration. Starting in the mid-1970s, protective fences for the toads have been regularly built. Furthermore, from 1973 to 1990, a yearly flea market took place in Möslepark. However, in order to preserve the nature, it does not do so anymore.

In the Möslepark, up to 200 year old oak trees, hornbeams, and big rhododendrons can be found. Moreover, it is an important habitat for bats, such as the noctule. The park is part of the nature preserve Lorettoberg-Günterstal-Littenweiler.

=== Moosweiher Park ===
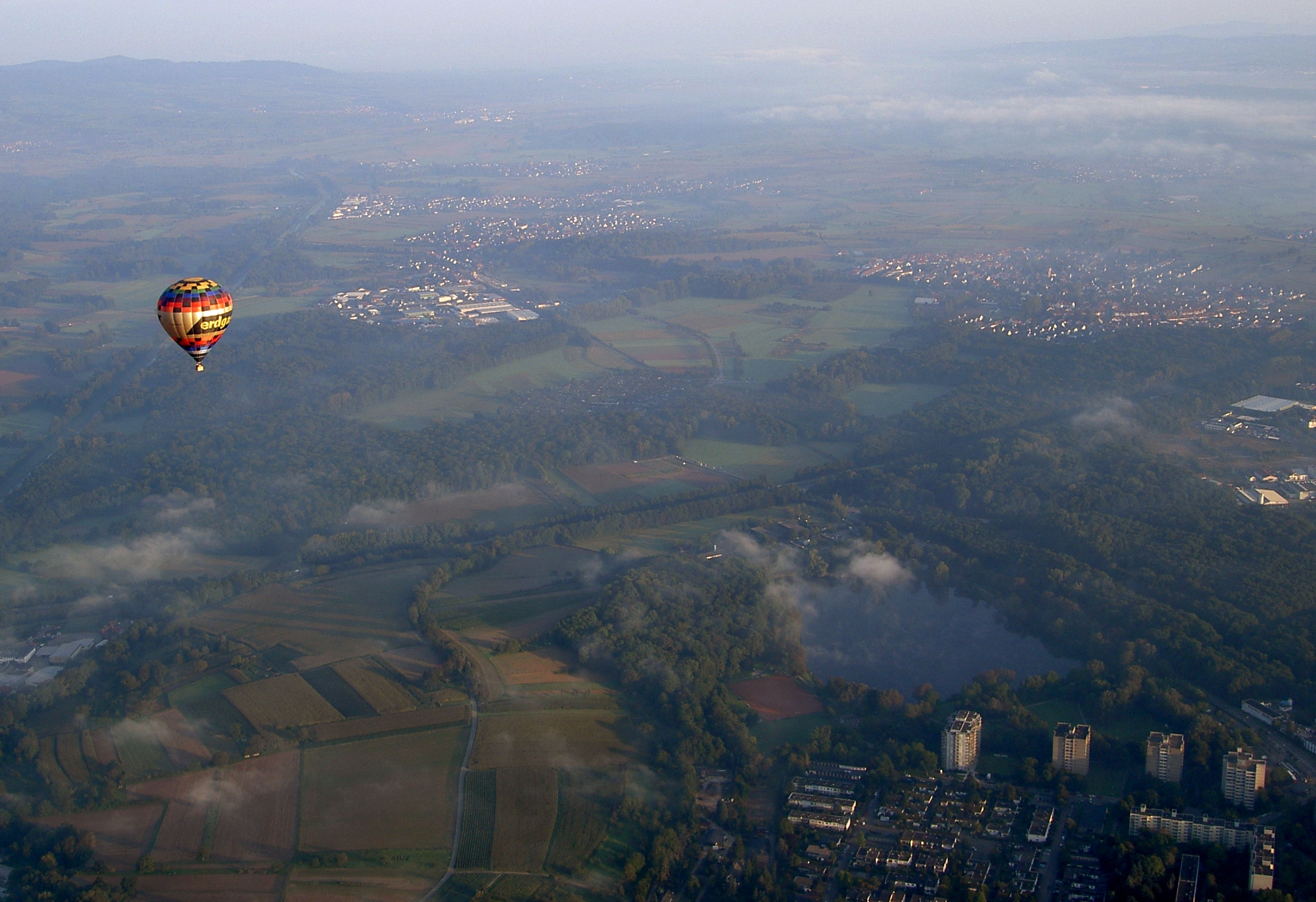
Moosweiher

The eleven-metre-deep (36 ft) pond Moosweiher emerged from the removal of gravel that was necessary to build the A5 between 1960 and 1962. At the time, the district Landwasser, in which the Moosweiher is located today, had not arisen yet. In 1966, the local county named the quarry pond Moosweiher, and in 1968, it was recultivated by the municipal parks department, by installing paths with benches, sunbathing lawns, and a playground. A restaurant, a minigolf facility, public toilets, and sports facilities with a club house were added later.

Today, the 153,000-square-metre (38-acre) park surrounding the Moosweiher is a close-to-nature landscape park with alder trees, oaks, ash trees, poplars, and willows. Besides released red-eared and yellow-bellied sliders, the coypu is also a native resident.

It is possible to bathe in the pond, and a half-pipe for skateboarders is located on the northern bank. Between 1987 and 2010, the Landwasser Triathlon used to take place there.

=== Stühlinger Church Square ===
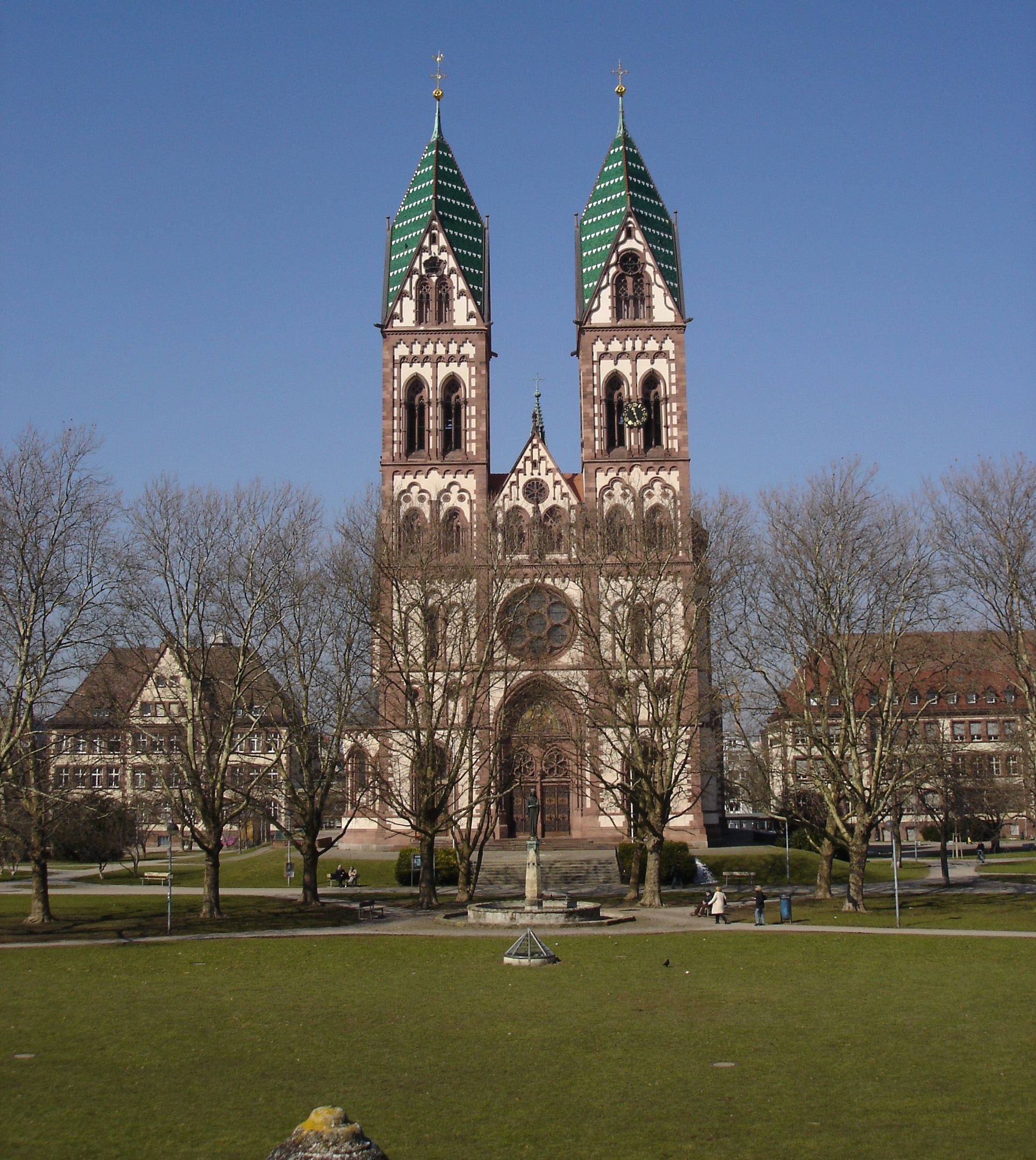
The Stühlinger Church Square and the Herz-Jesu-Kirche

The 180,000-square-metre (44-acre) Stühlinger church square, which is located between Freiburg main station and the church Herz-Jesu-Kirche, was redesigned in 1985, after some parts of the area were repurposed in 1983 due to the building of the city train bridge (today called Stühlinger Brücke). This space, however, was compensated by adding a different area to the church square. The geometrically designed park with a central lawn, in which Ralf Witthaus, an artist from Cologne, has tilled a pattern using a strimmer in 2011, is framed by a pergola in the east.

The concrete sculpture Zwei Riesen. Einer spuckt. Einer schluckt. (Two giants. One spits. One swallows.), created by Franz Gutmann, is located under the Stühlinger Brücke. Between the two giants, the Stühlinger farmers' market takes place every Wednesday and Saturday morning.

Between 1894 and 1929, the church square was also the location of the trade fair of Freiburg. Since 1995, a nostalgic fair with old fairground rides takes place there once a year. In 2012, the final concert of the Freiburg parade of Basel Tattoo was held there, too.

As this place, which is close to the city center, is also frequented by homeless or addicted people, an outreach program has been set up. Since 2008, two municipal social workers in their specially marked vehicles take care of these people two to three times per week.

=== Other parks ===
The following parks are described in further detail through the links. Therefore, only a brief description is provided here.

- Since 1872, the Alte Friedhof (Old Graveyard), found in the district Neuburg, is used as a park. Its character as a graveyard does not retract from its natural and cultural uniqueness.
- After several relocations, the Freiburg Botanic Garden is now located in the district Herdern aside the botanical institute of the University of Freiburg.
- The Colombipark is the small central park of Freiburg. Both Colombipark and Colombischlössle were created on the area of a former bastion in 1860.
- The Mundenhof with its municipal garden center and animal enclosures is in the western part of the city. The Mundenhof is Freiburg's smallest district and is located near the motorway.
- The Schlossberg is a tree-covered hill located east of the historical city center. It offers various lookouts including a tower called Schlossbergturm and there are two restaurants. The top of the hill can be reached by foot or by the Schlossbergbahn which runs from the Stadtgarten (municipal garden) to the Burghaldering. There are still some vines on the southern slope of the Schlossberg.
- The Seepark, which is located in the western part of Freiburg, was built in 1986 in context of the Landesgartenschau (federal state gardening exhibition). Its construction was based on the extension of an already-existing quarry pond. Offering several recreational facilities as well as a community center with restaurant and an observation tower, it is Freiburg's most visited park.
- In 1888 the park Stadtgarten, in the north of Freiburg's historical city center, was finished and can today be accessed via the footbridge named Karlssteg. Although heavily damaged in 1944, the Stadtgarten features not only old trees and lawn areas but also beds of perennial and ever-changing array of flowers, a rose garden, two water basins, a music pavilion, a playground, and a kiosk. An inclined elevator and a footbridge named Mozartsteg connects the park with the Schlossberg.
- Nearby Arlesheimer See, an artificial lake, and the forest surrounding it, are a designated nature reserve.

== Bibliography ==
- Vermessungsamt der Stadt Freiburg, ed. Freiburg im Breisgau: amtlicher Stadtplan. Freiburg: 2001/2002. ISBN 3-00-007737-5.
