= Karlssteg =

Coordinates: 47°59′50″N 7°51′22″E

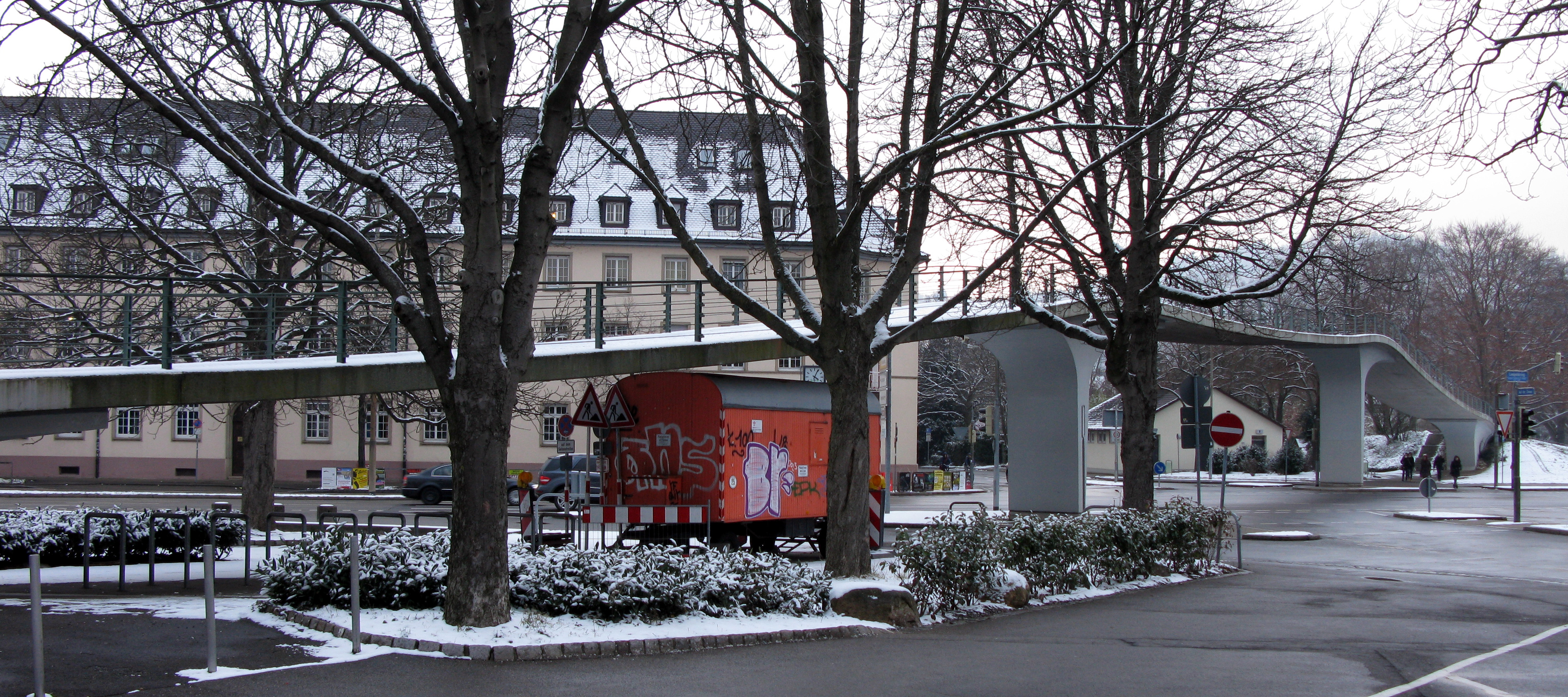
Karlssteg Bridge

The Karlssteg is a 136.5 meter long footbridge of tension construction in Freiburg im Breisgau, Germany. A concrete strip only 25 cm thick with 60 continuous tension elements leads from Karlsplatz to the Stadtgarten. In high temperatures, the tension band can sag up to 40 cm. Construction of the bridge began in 1969; in January 1970, the columns were already standing, and in June, for the city's 850th anniversary, the Karlssteg Bridge – constructed by the engineer H.Nehse – was opened to traffic as the first bridge of its kind in Germany. In the same year, the Mozart, Hermann and Schwabentor bridges were opened, though in a less spectacular way, passing over Mozartstraße (Mozart Street) and Schlossbergring.

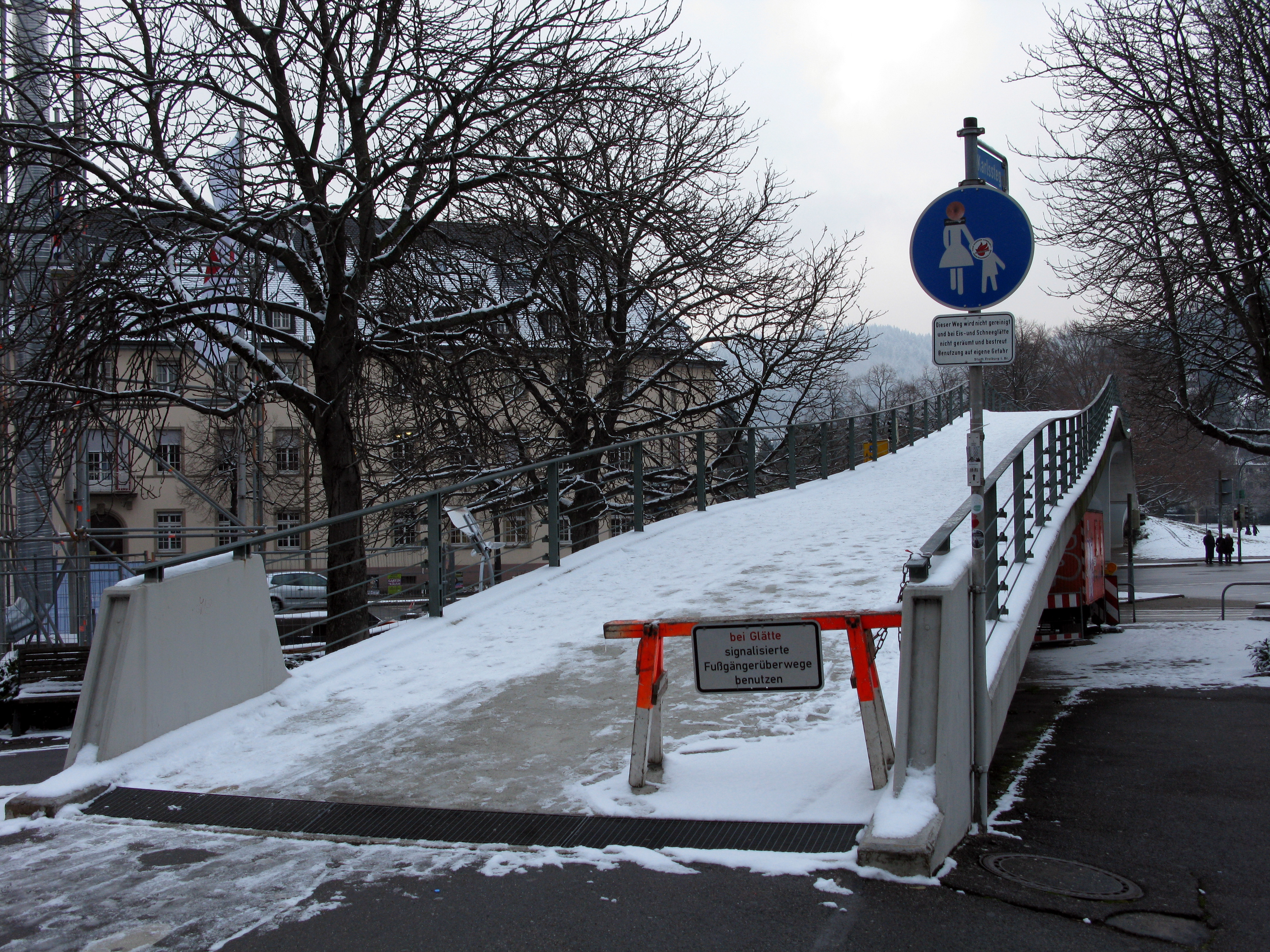
Karlssteg with warning barrier in winter

At the opening, a four-tonne construction vehicle stood alongside Lord Mayor Eugen Keidel on top of the 664.000 Deutsche Marks (approximately 300,000 British pounds) to demonstrate the load-bearing capacity. The artificial resin coating on the bridge causes problems due to its loosening from the concrete, and has had to be renovated several times over the last few years. Also, the flooring does not tolerate the scattering of road salt. Therefore, in the event of snow and ice, barriers with warning signs are put in place to prevent pedestrians from crossing the bridge. Initially, the installation of a heating system was discussed but proved too costly to be put in place.

The bridge was involved in a copyright dispute in 2006. In 1990, the photographer Karl Heinz Raach photographed the Freiburg Minster with the Karlssteg Bridge in the foreground. The photo became a postcard and was released in a Freiburg picture book. From the same position, the photo was imitated for a calendar of the Volksbank of Freiburg and taken by a different professional photographer in 2003. In turn, Raach complained about such imitation, and was proven right in the second instance.

== Literature ==
- Carola Schark (1997-08-25), "In kühnem Schwung vom Karlsplatz zum Stadtgarten", Badische Zeitung (in German)
