= Mundenhof =

- Stadtteil of Freiburg im Breisgau
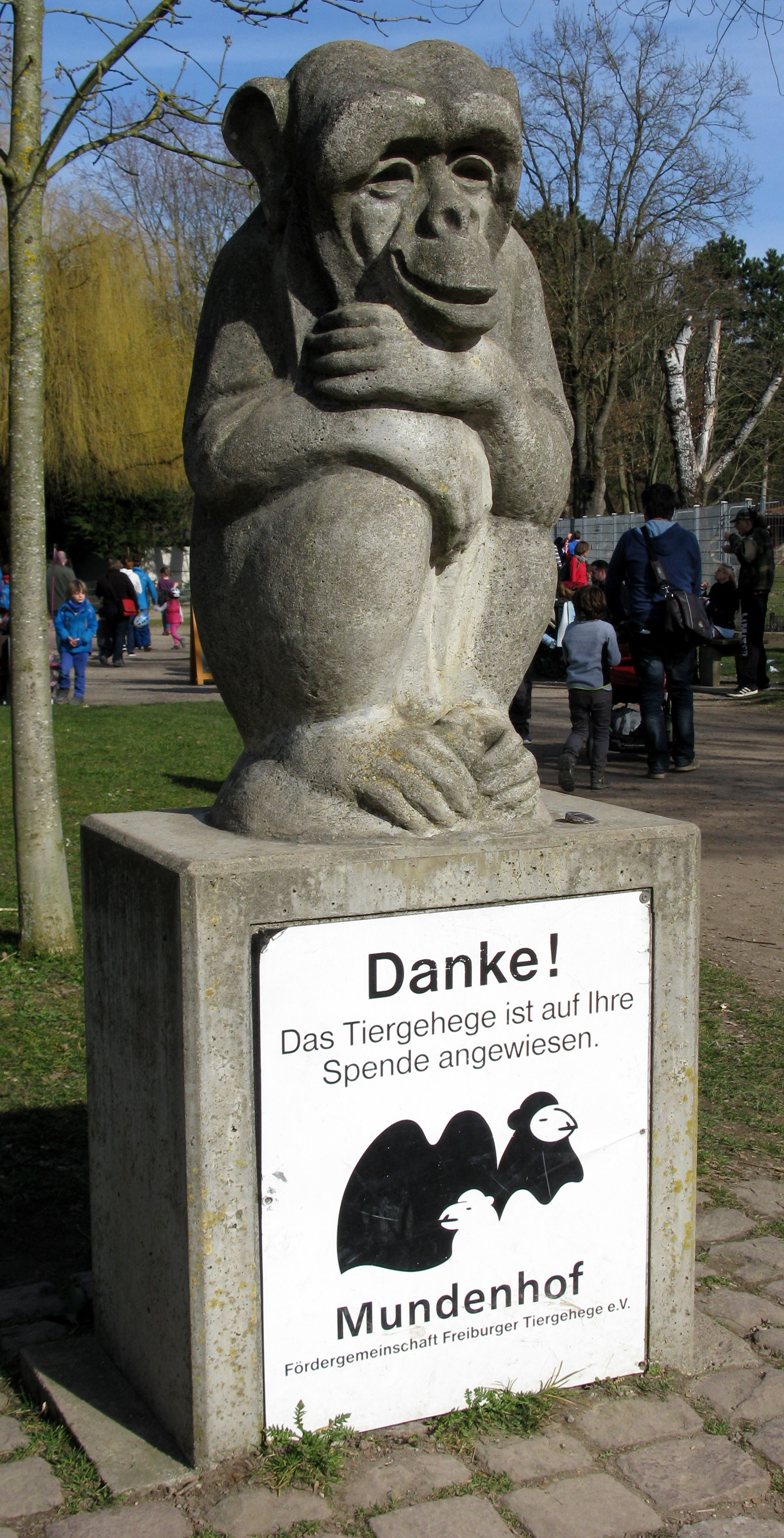
- Sculpture at a central part of the Mundenhof

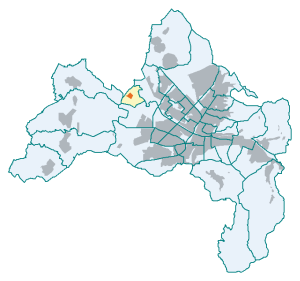
- Location within Freiburg
- Interactive map of Mundenhof
- Location within Germany Location within Baden-Württemberg
- Coordinates: 48°01′01″N 7°46′37″E
- Country: Germany
- State: Baden-Württemberg
- Admin. region: Freiburg
- District: Stadtkreis
- City: Freiburg im Breisgau

Population (2020-12-31)
  - Total: 45
- Time zone: UTC+01:00 (CET)
  - Summer (DST): UTC+02:00 (CEST)
- Postal codes: 79111

The Mundenhof (German pronunciation: [ˈmʊndn̩hoːf]) is located on the western edge of Freiburg im Breisgau, and is the smallest district in Freiburg, with only 46 residents. The zoo on the grounds of the Mundenhof is well-visited. The municipal garden center is also located on the grounds. The Mundenhof is one of many Green Spaces in Freiburg, which present a major factor in its reputation as a green city.

== History ==
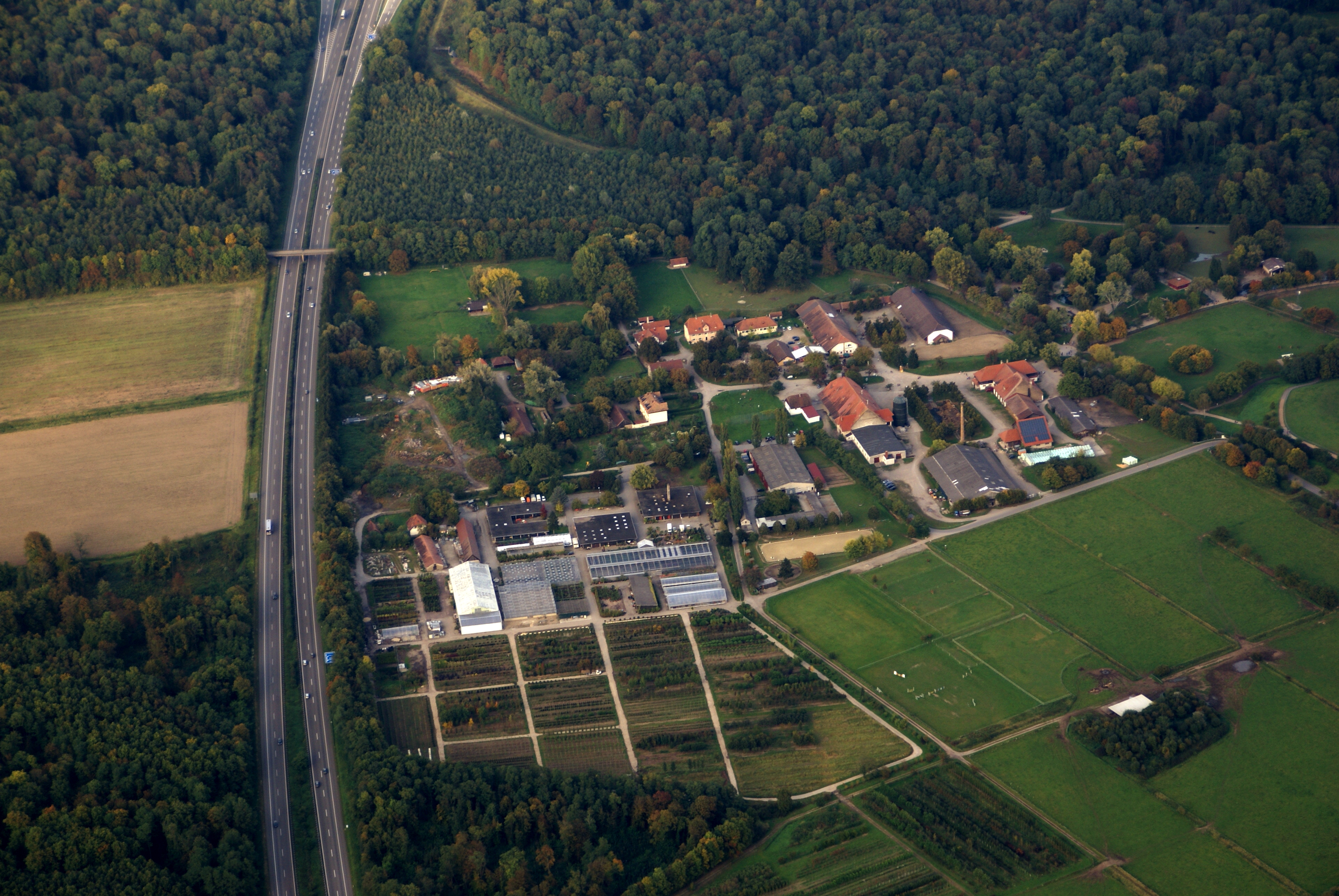
Mundenhof from above

The earliest documented reference to the Mundenhof estate is from 12 September 864. This document was a deed of gift, in which the owner, a priest named Rumolt, bequeaths the Muntichova estate unto the Abbey of Saint Gall for agricultural use. From 1294 to 1806, the "Mundenhof" estate belonged to the monastery of Günterstal. The monastery was abolished as a result of secularization, and the Mundenhof was annexed by the Grand Duchy of Baden, which in turn sold it in 1808 to the University of Freiburg. In 1889, the city of Freiburg purchased a large part of the grounds for agricultural use. After that, the city also purchased a big area surrounding the Mundenhof to be used for the Freiburger Rieselfelder, a natural water purification plant, which was operated by people living in the Mundenhof. In 1920, this area had to be enlarged to 320 hectares. At that time it was one of the biggest farms in Baden-Württemberg. In its heyday, it had 400 cows that produced about 400,000 liters of milk. Additionally, pig breeding and crop production were another means of making a living on the Mundenhof. In 1985, the water purification plant was stopped, and the Mundenhof lost one source of revenue. This and price deterioration made the farm uneconomical, so in order to survive, it was changed into a model ecological farm. This farm covers the demands of all the straw and food for the animals in the enclosure. In 1991, part of the Rieselfelder became the new district of Rieselfeld, covering 18 hectares. Another area was turned into the Rieselfeld nature conservation area, which is situated between Rieselfeld and the Mundenhof estate.

Until December 31, 1977, the grounds of the Mundenhof estate were part of the township of Umkirch, though it technically belonged to the city of Freiburg. On the January 1, 1978, it became fully integrated into the city of Freiburg as a result of a referendum among the residents. In return, Umkirch was given a smaller area, called Lehen, to the west of the nearby motorway, the A5.

== Zoo ==
In 1968, the grounds were converted to a small outdoor zoo, called a Tiergehege in German to differentiate it from larger zoological gardens. It is the largest zoo in Baden-Württemberg, covering 38 hectares. Eugen Keidel, mayor of Freiburg im Breisgau at the time, was a strong supporter of the project, and on September 28, 1968, the zoo was opened to the public.

In 1971 the Fördergemeinschaft Freiburger Tiergehege e.V. (Friends’ association for Freiburg zoological gardens) was founded. Domesticated species from all over the world and some undomesticated species can now be seen at the Mundenhof.

A top priority of the Mundenhof zoo is to care for and display endangered domesticated species. The open-air exhibition ground is divided into eight sections, each of which are host to various species specific to particular continents. The zoo is home to peacocks, gibbons, crab-eating macaques, emus, ostriches, alpacas, yaks, llamas, and many other species. About 30 different species and about 180 individual animals can be observed.

The Verein der Aquarien- und Terrarienfreunde e.V. (Friends‘ association of aquariums and terrariums) converted a former horse barn to house 3 terrariums and 12 pools. The pools range in volume from 500 liters (132 US gallons) to 3000 liters (792 US gallons), and they are divided into 5 salt water and 7 fresh water pools. This section of the park is also dependent on donations to exist, because entry is free.

The park has many interconnecting paths with various viewing points with views of the city of Freiburg and the surrounding land. There is also a restaurant on the grounds of the Mundenhof, called the Hofwirtschaft. Next to the restaurant is a playground. A further attraction are the storks that nest on the Mundenhof grounds. Their nests are further off, but can easily be observed through binoculars.

The zoo is open 24/7. There is no entrance fee, since the zoo is financed by donations, but a parking fee is another source of revenue. Bus line 19 takes visitors to the park.

== KonTiKi ==
KonTiKi is a social program with the goal of bringing nature closer to children aged six and up. These children are given the opportunity to learn about flora and fauna in their free-time, so that they can learn how to treat nature with respect, take up the mantle of responsibility, and gather social experience.

== Zelt-Musik-Festival/Tent Music Festival ==
Next to the Mundenhof zoo grounds is an area where the international Zelt-Musik-Festival (ZMF) takes place every year. It is one of the oldest events of its kind in Europe. Through its mixture of older and modern, more popular music, the Tent-Music-Festival attracts many music fans. The special feature of the festival is that all the events take place inside big-top tents.
