= Zelt-Musik-Festival =

Music festival in Freiburg, Germany

Coordinates: 48.0089°N 7.7804°E

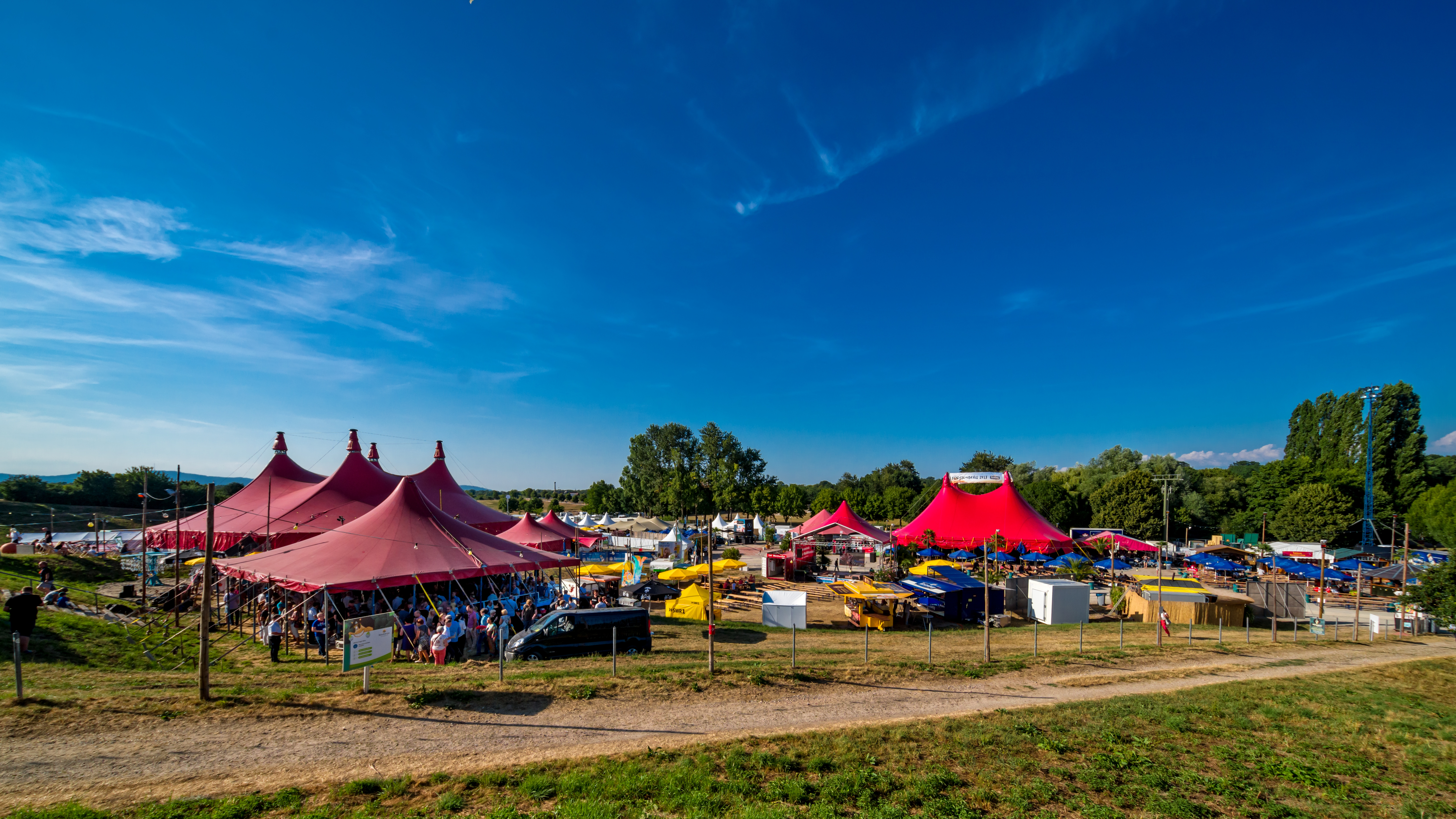
Zelt Musik Festival 2018

The Zelt-Musik-Festival (ZMF) has taken place every June and July since 1983 in Freiburg im Breisgau, Germany. It lasts three weeks and counts up to 120,000 visitors each year. The program is very broad. There is music, art, theater, cabaret and sport in different tents and on open-air stages. According to the organizer it is the biggest and oldest music festival in Baden-Württemberg. Over the years, more than 600 regional and international artists offered a diverse program consisting of classic, jazz, rock, pop and world music, cabaret and children's program. Also, many newcomers have been promoted.

What makes the festival unique is that the admission is free. Visitors can enter the two large tents—he circus tent and the spiegeltent—and two additional open-air tents as well as one stage in one of the tents. On these stages there are free all-day concerts, art and youth-culture events. Since 2008, the ZMF has been working with the Jugend-Bildungswerk's program called Youngstars in Action. The ZMF is famous for the diverse offer of music genres.

== History ==
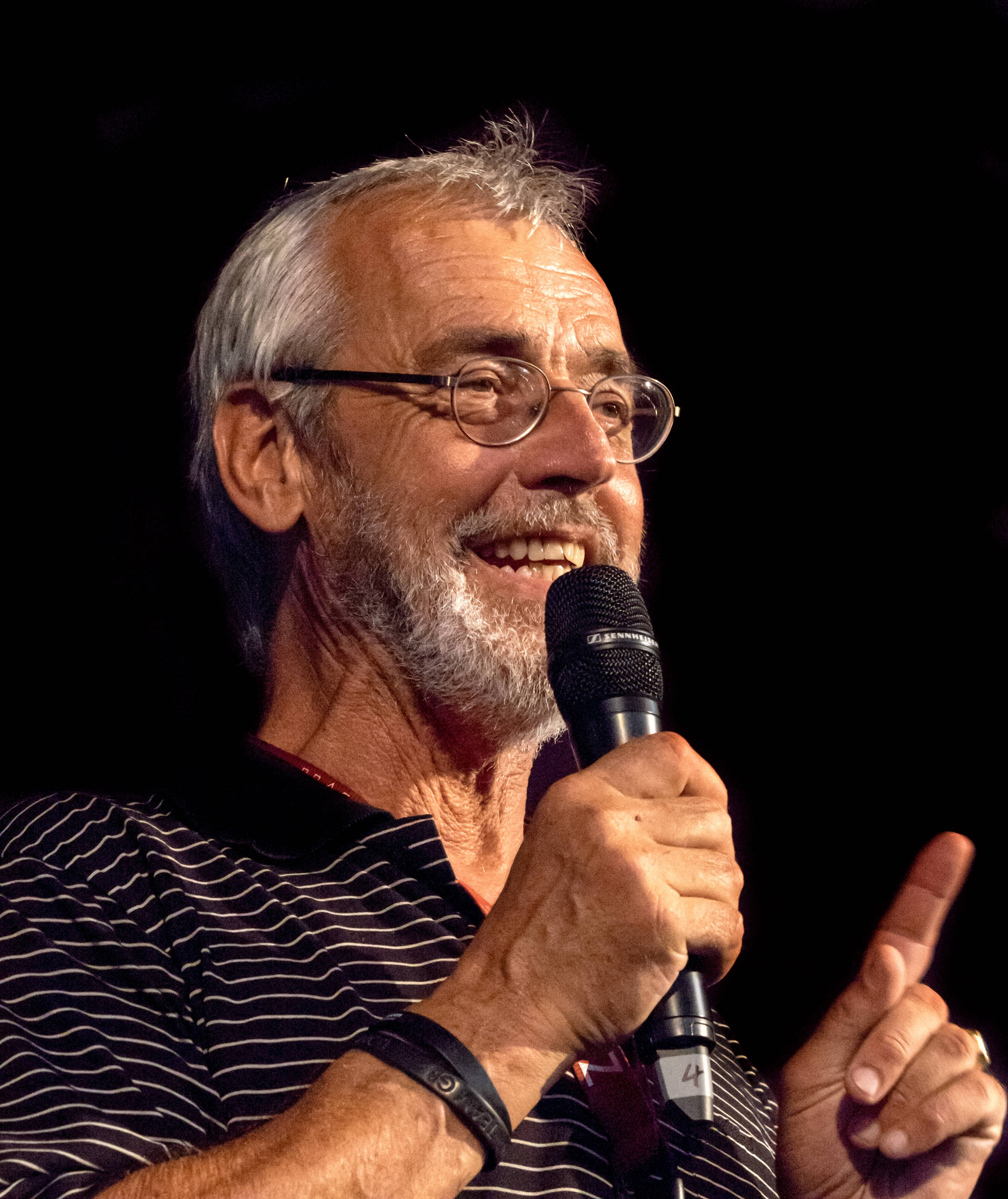
Alexander Heisler, the inventor of the festival

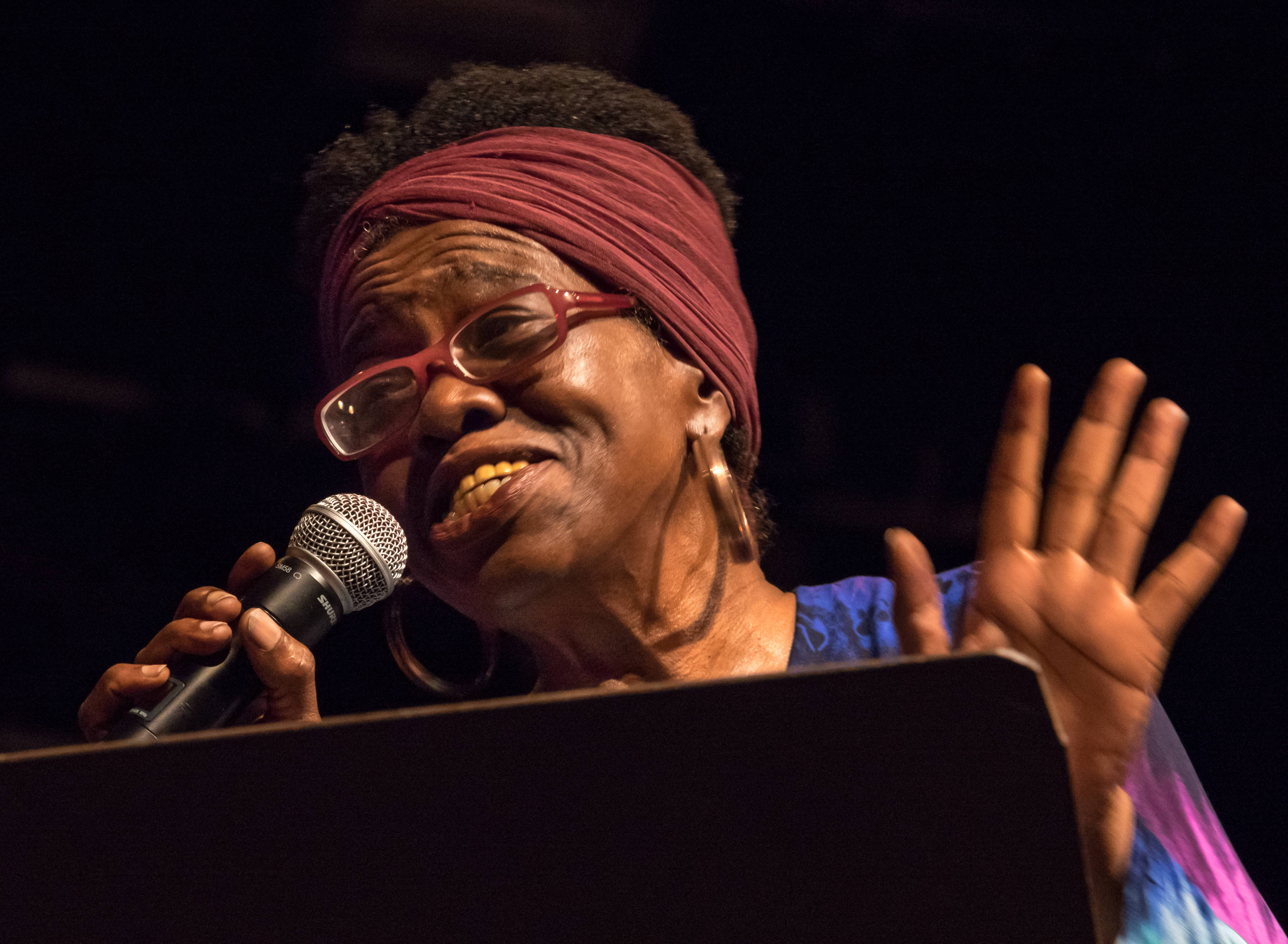
Brenda Boykin a famous jazz singer (2015)

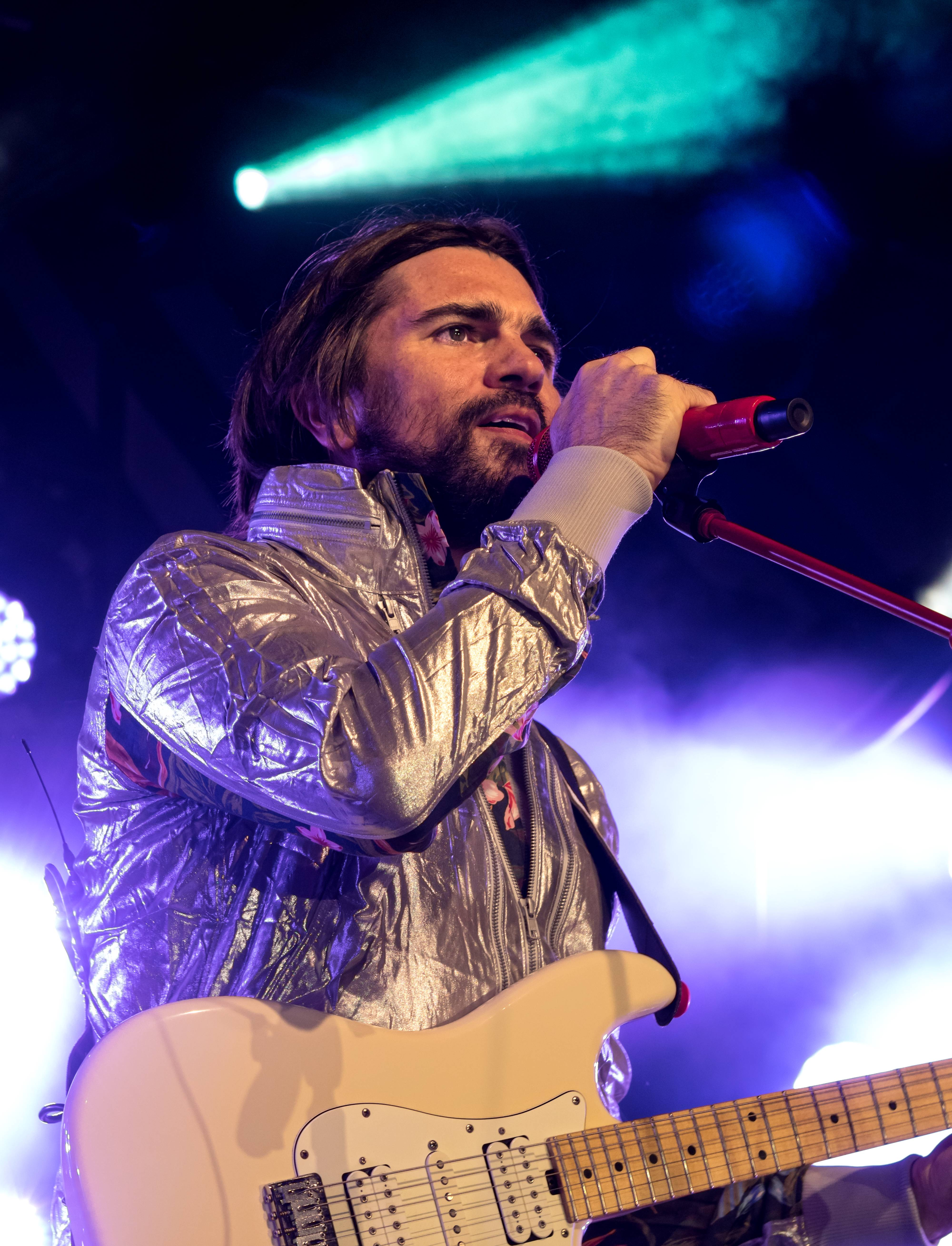
Juanes at the ZMF 2015

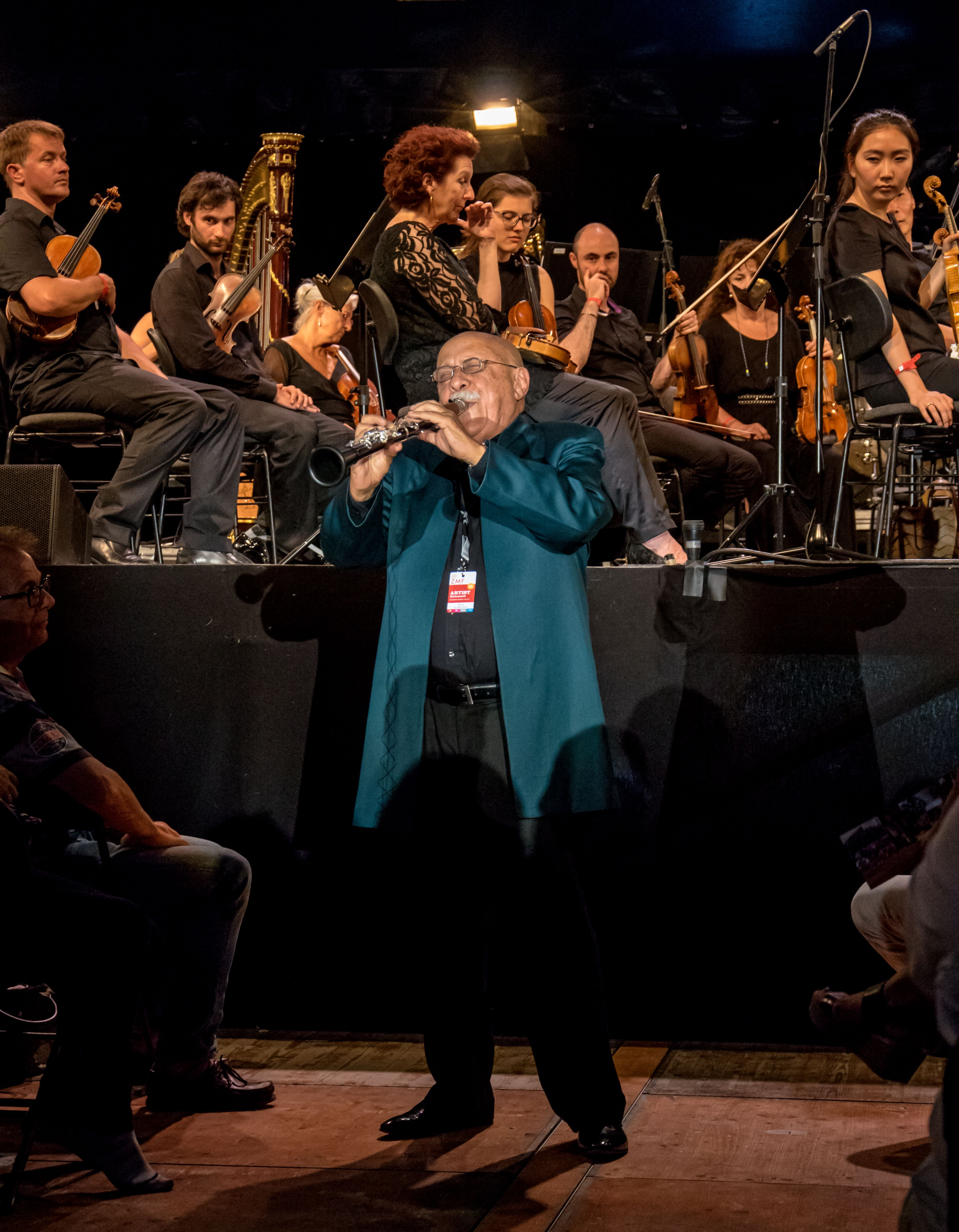
Giora Feidman at the ZMF 2016

Alexander Heisler, Uli Homann and Rolf Böhme (the mayor of Freiburg at the time) founded the festival in 1983 as a continuation of "Klassik & Jazz" (Classic & Jazz), a series of events that were organized in the 1970s at the University of Freiburg. The first festival (1983) took place on the (Old) Trade Fair Square in Freiburg (with the catering and circus tents) and right in front of the Kollegiengebäude II of the University of Freiburg, nowadays the Old Synagogue Square (with a spiegeltent). For the festival in 1984, the three tents were placed in Eschholzpark near the Technical Town Hall. Since 1985, the tents have been set up outside of the city center in a local recreation area near the Mundenhof Zoo. Due to a lack of parking space, a 'combination ticket' was created together with the public transport network of Freiburg (Freiburger Verkehrs AG), allowing the entrance ticket for the ZMF to also act as a ticket for public transport. By doing this, ZMF has to be one of the pioneers in environmental protection at such events.

The event organizers were facing major financial problems in the 1990s. On 22 September 2006—he year that the FIFA World Cup was taking place in Germany—the sponsoring association and the organizers of the ZMF had to file for insolvency because of, among other things, low ticket sales. Since 2007, the ZMF has been organized by the Zelt-Musik-Festival GmbH. This company was founded by ZMF founding father, Alexander Heisler, together with Andreas Schnitzler, Dieter Pfaff and Alexander Hanusch and is owned to one third by KOKO & DTK Entertainment GmbH. Alexander Hanusch and Marc Oßwald managed the firm the first year. Between 2012 and 2014, visitor numbers stabilized. Since 2017, Vaddi Concerts GmbH, managed by Marc Oßwald, and the Zelt-Musik-Festival GmbH have been entrusted with the realization of the ZMF Freiburg.

Artists and bands like Jethro Tull, Hannes Wader, Juliette Gréco, Gregory Porter, James Brown, Loriot or Ten Years After, but also Sasha, Fettes Brot, Katzenjammer, Annett Louisan or Juli performed at the "Zelt-Musik-Festival".

In 2009, the festival attracted 34,000 visitors, in 2010 40,000 and in 2011 42,000 visitors. These days, the festival attracts around 40,000 visitors for the concerts and over 100,000 people who visit the general festival area. According to the organizers, in the first 30 years in the history of the festival, which includes 540 days of music, 2000 events attracted over 500,000 visitors. Altogether, over three million people have attended the concerts of 22,000 artists.

American jazz clarinettist Perry Robinson has attended every festival since 1988, which is why some people call him the "Soul of the Festival". In 2014, he was honored with the gala night at the festival on the occasion of his 75th birthday.

In 2015, twelve concerts were sold out before the festival started, one of them was the opening gig, where Andreas Bourani performed. Besides the concerts in the circus tent and the spiegeltent, the ZMF traditionally offers free concerts in the "Fürstenbergzelt", at the open-air stage and at several places around the festival area. Part of that offer is a daily cabaret program.

At the 2015 festival, an artist caused the festival's first scandal: Lindsey Stirling cancelled her concert, stage time 8 p.m., at 5.30 p.m. due to the heat. She refused to accept the proposal to postpone the concert for a few hours. In her place, Manuel Dubrinski, the first violinist of the Philharmonic Orchestra Freiburg, performed at the festival. In the big circus tent, 18 events took place in 19 days. In the spiegeltent, it was 30 events, 14 of which—excluding the Club Nights—were sold out. A total of 350 artists participated in the main program and 830 artists in the more than one hundred events of the action program. During those events, 570 young artists were promoted.

The concert "Im Auftrag der Liebe" by Dieter Thomas Kuhn, which took place on 16 July 2016 in the circus tent, went on sale on 11 August 2015 and was already sold out on the same day at 5:20 p.m. This was the first time an artist had given two concerts in one year at the ZMF, and both were sold out in a very short time.

Enrique Ugarte conducted the Freiburg Philharmonic Orchestra at the ZMF's "Gala for Peace" in 2016. The Gala was also dedicated to the Israeli clarinettist and klezmer musician Giora Feidman in honor of his 80th birthday.

The new district called Dietenbach, which is very close to the festival location, has aroused concern among the organizers of the festival that they will be forced to move away. However, the head of the "Dietenbach Project Group", Rüdiger Engel, the former head of the building rights office, said that this should not be a problem if the ZMF was listed in the city's land register—much like it is done for the Oktoberfest in Munich.
