= Stadtgarten Freiburg =

Urban park in Freiburg, Germany

Coordinates: 47.997796°N 7.857407°E

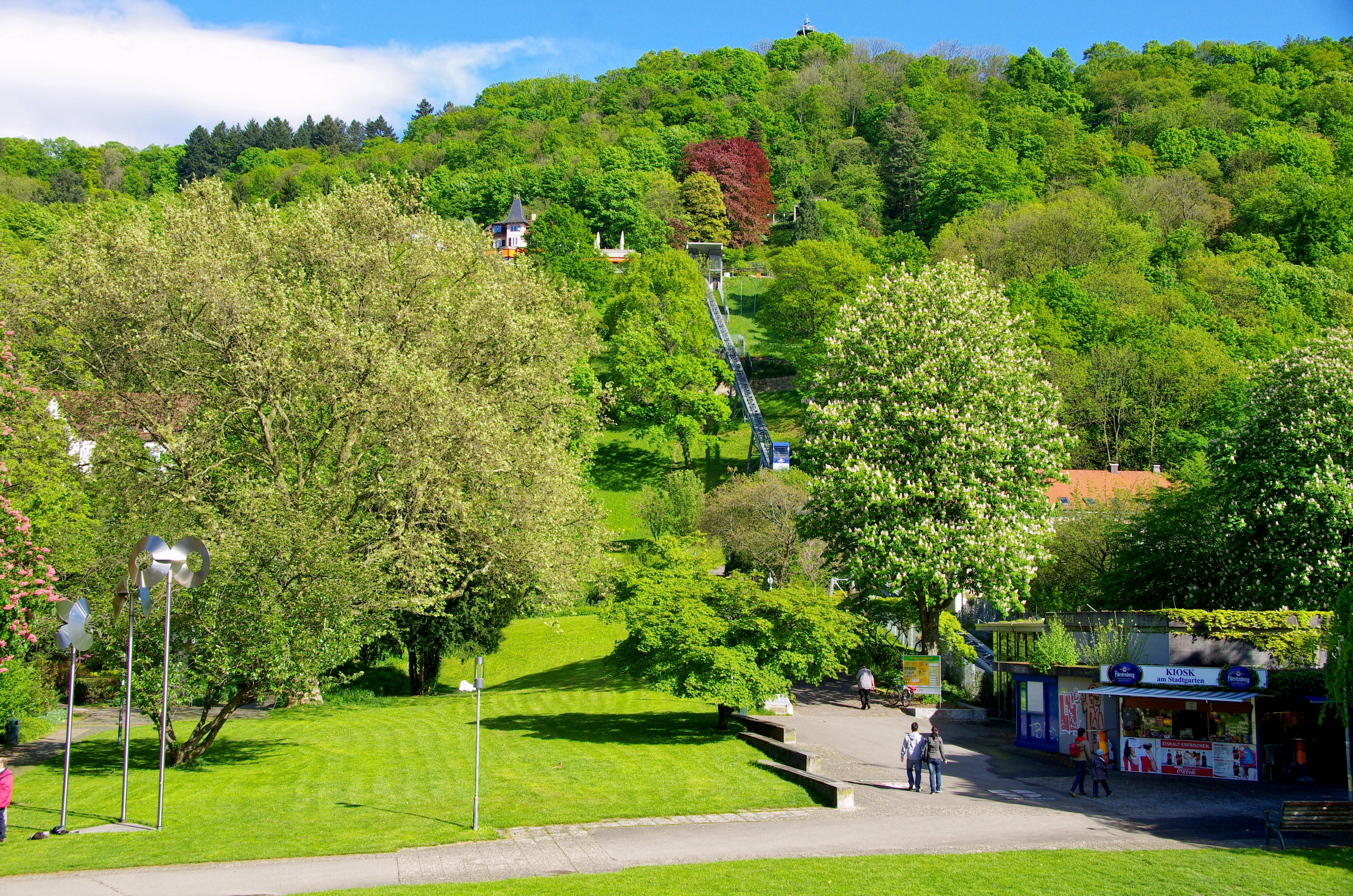
Image of the City Garden with Schlossberg Tram

The Stadtgarten (City Garden) of Freiburg is a 2.6-hectare (6.4-acre) park within the Neuburg district. It has an old tree grove and a large rose garden, and lies between the Leopoldring, Jackob Burckhardt, Ludwig, and Mozart streets near Freiburg's city centre. It is connected to Karlsplatz via the Karlssteg footbridge, which is made from prestressed concrete. Since 2008 the Schlossberg Tram, an inclined elevator, leads up to Schlossberg. It replaced the Schlossberg Cable Car built in 1968.

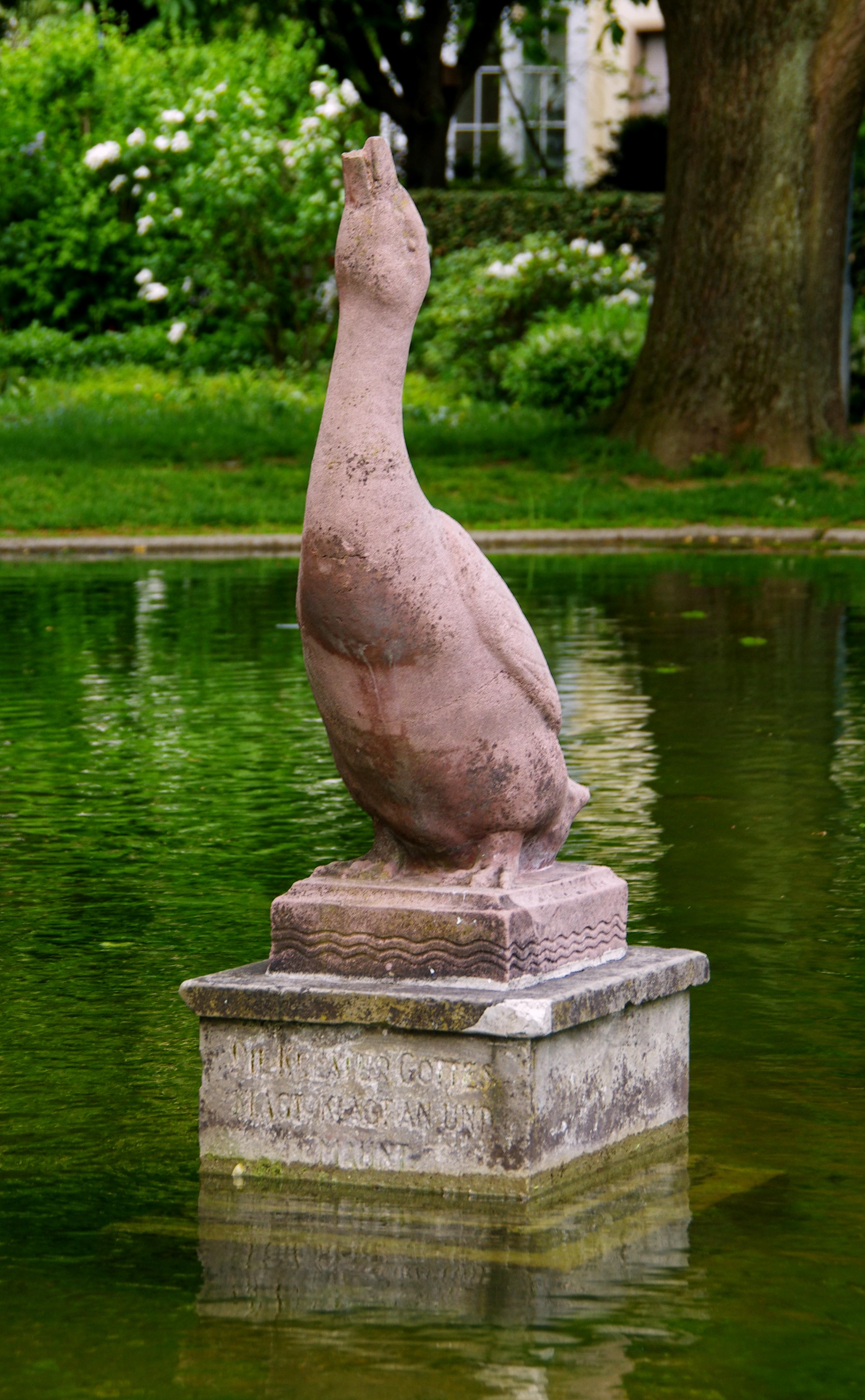
The Freiburg Erpel

The music pavilion in the park is used during summer for concerts and as a freelance stage. The Theatresports open-air-festival has taken place in the Stadtgarten pavilion since 1997. In addition to perennial and interspersed pines, the garden includes a children's playground as well as two ponds and wells. The Stadtgarten also held the Schlossbergfest, which was held once a year during the summer, with several thousand candles burning in the city garden and on the Schlossberg. It took place for the last time in 2011.

== History ==
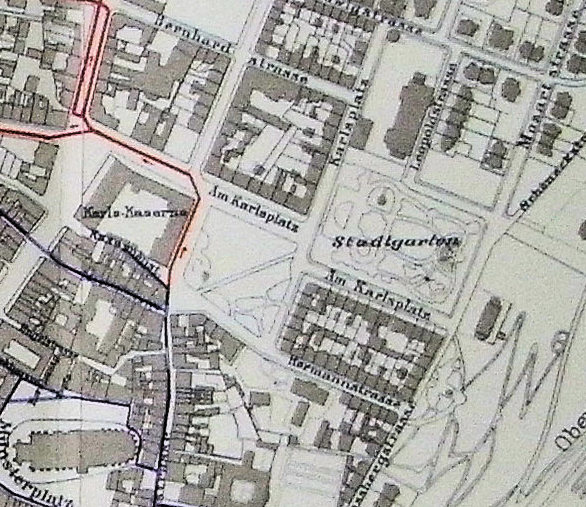
City map from the turn of the century showing the original extent of the park

The city garden was created as a result of the "Oberrheinische Gewerbeausstellung" (Upper Rhine Industrial Exhibition) of 1887, which had taken place on Karlsplatz, the former drill and measuring station. As late as 1887, the city gardener Schmöger was commissioned to design and build the something similar. The park was already completed and opened in 1888, and even charged an entry fee until 1911. The original features included an aquarium, music pavilion, fountain, and a children's playground. In addition to this, there was an enclosure with a Rhesus Monkey named Anne, which is now displayed in the Museum of Nature and Men. Starting in 1889, there were areas in the western Schlossberg which were created as a forest park. As a consequence of the First World War, the care was neglected, though the terrain was redesigned from 1920 to 1924. Due to the air attack on the city in 1944 (Operation Tigerfish), the concert hall and park were destroyed, and the park remained in this form. After the Second World War, the City Garden was restored. This began in 1948 with the filling of the bomb craters and the clearing of the paths; this partial reconstruction was part of the Baden Industry and Trade Exhibition ("Badische Industrie- und Gewerbeausstellung"). From 1952 on the park has been being wholly restored and even expanded northwards, taking in the area of the former festival hall. In 1967 its southern area was reduced to clear a space for the construction of the Leopoldring. In the 1960s, the cable car to the restaurant "Dattler" was built, which had been planned in 1914.

=== Festival Hall ===
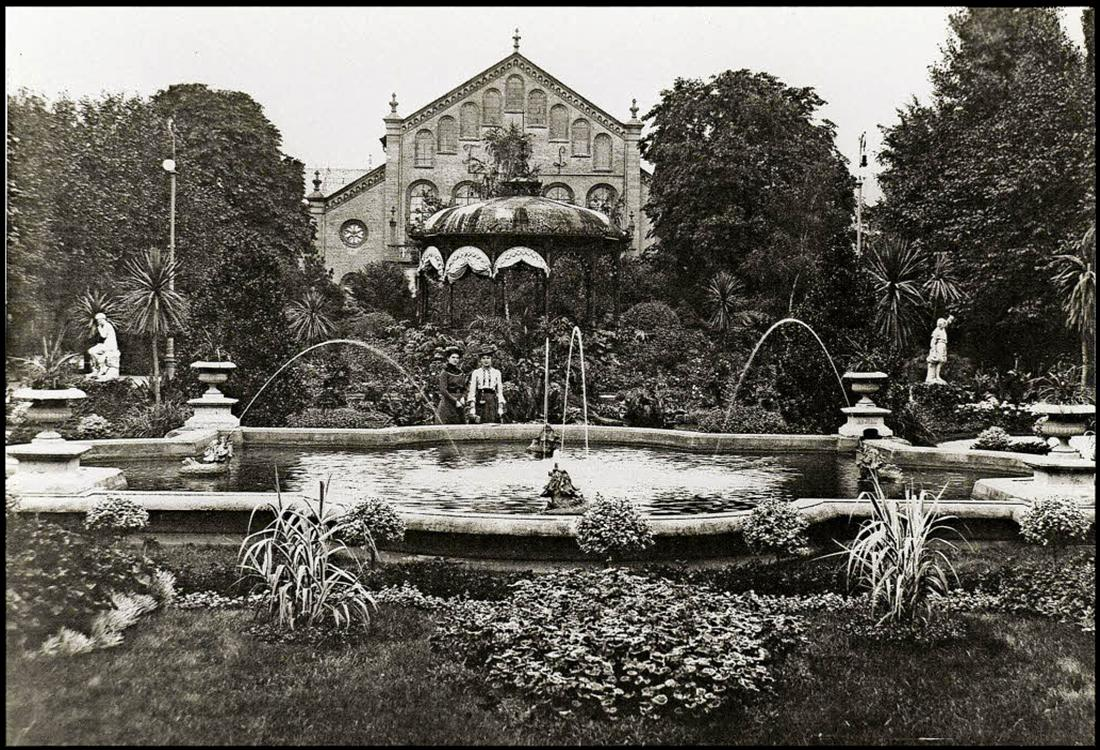
City Garden Freiburg with artwork and festival hall from 1900

Part of the city garden of Freiburg was still the northerly located festival hall. Its construction was already planned for the Baden Singer Festival ("Badisches Sängerfest") which took place in 1846. However, the building only began on 10 August 1846; the roof truss was erected on 2 October 1847, and the provisionally completed hall subsequently used as depot and casern in the Baden Revolution. Only when the riots ceased did the construction continue in 1852, and the festival hall was opened two years later. The plans for the festival hall came from Friedrich Eisenlohr; the constructer was the Freiburg architect Schneider. The hall was destroyed in the night of bombing on 27 November 1944 and was not been rebuilt afterwards. Today, the rose garden is situated in the hall's former location. Trade fairs and exhibitions took place in the town and fair hall in eastern Wiehre located at Alter Messplatz starting in 1954, until they were relocated at the Messe Freiburg in 1999. The premises of the former festival hall, including the area opposite Leopoldstraße which does not exist anymore, were added to the city garden.

=== Music Pavilion ===
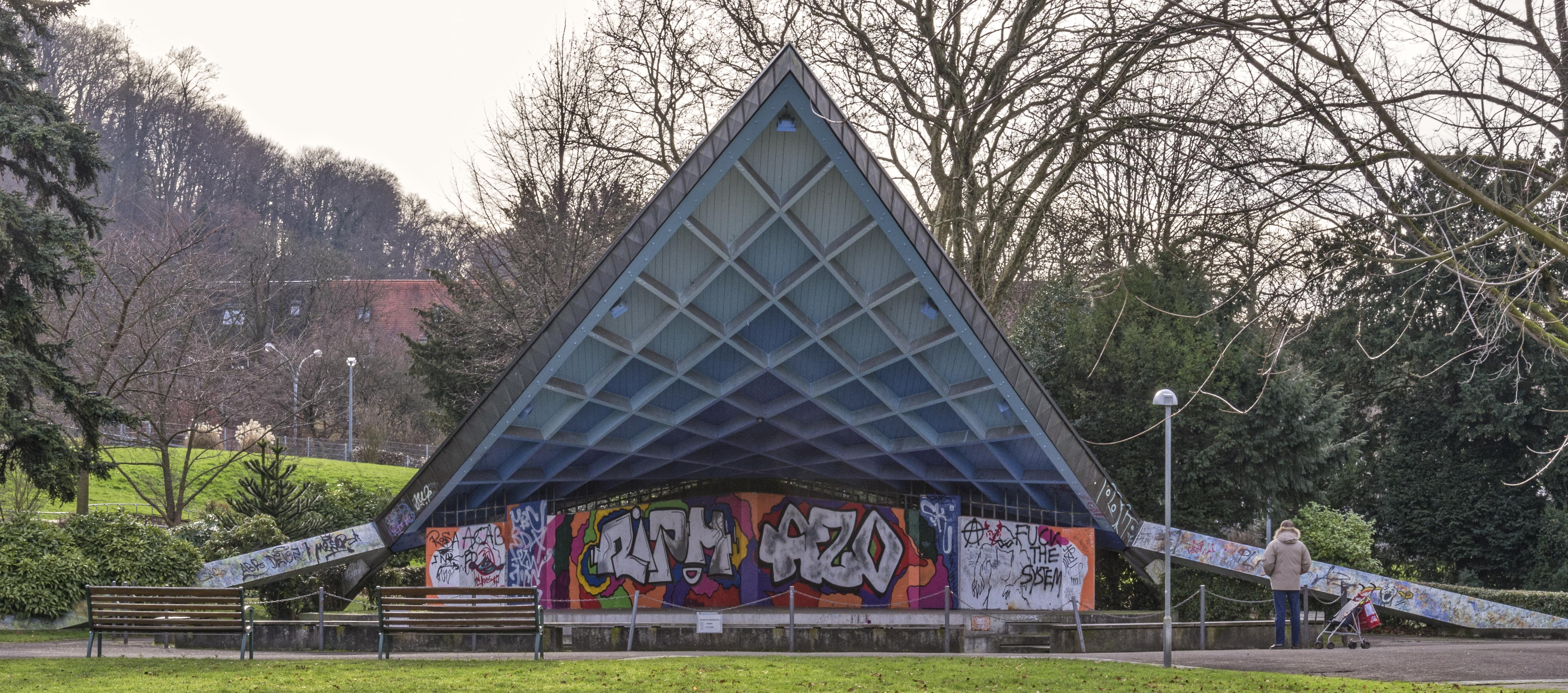
Music Pavilion

The music pavilion was designed by Max Scherberger, who was also stress analyst of the Aussichtsturm Schlossberg (Schlossberg tower), and built in 1969. The shape of the roof is a hyperbolic paraboloid. The bent surface of the unsupported roof are assembled with straight wooden elements. It was the first roof in the Federal Republic of Germany built in that way. The abutment made of concrete was drafted by Immo Kirsch, then head of the department for building construction. In summer 2015, during a routine check, water was detected within the roof. This meant that there was a danger of the building collapsing. Originally, the renovation was planned to be finished by July 2016, but due to rainy weather the completion was postponed to September when events started to take place again.

== Artwork ==
A number of sculptures are exhibited in the city garden. For example, a kinetic sculpture called Windspiel (lit. German for wind play) made of V24 stainless steel by Freiburg neurologist and sculptor Roland Phelps. It was set up in the year 2000. Another sculpture called Wartende (lit. German for waiting woman) was made by Richard Engelmann (1868–1966) in 1926 but was only set up in the city garden in 1950. According to the Freiburg State Archives, the owl made by Eva Eisenlorh (1891–1977) could originally have been set up at the University Clinic of Freiburg before being moved to the city garden. The so-called Illumina by Till-Peter Otto (1975) was made in scope of an exhibition of sundials at the Expo 200 in Hannover. On 22 January 2014, employees of the garden and civil engineering department of Freiburg noticed that the sculpture had been vandalized damaged, including the theft of its head, which cost €5000 (4460 British Pounds) to repair.

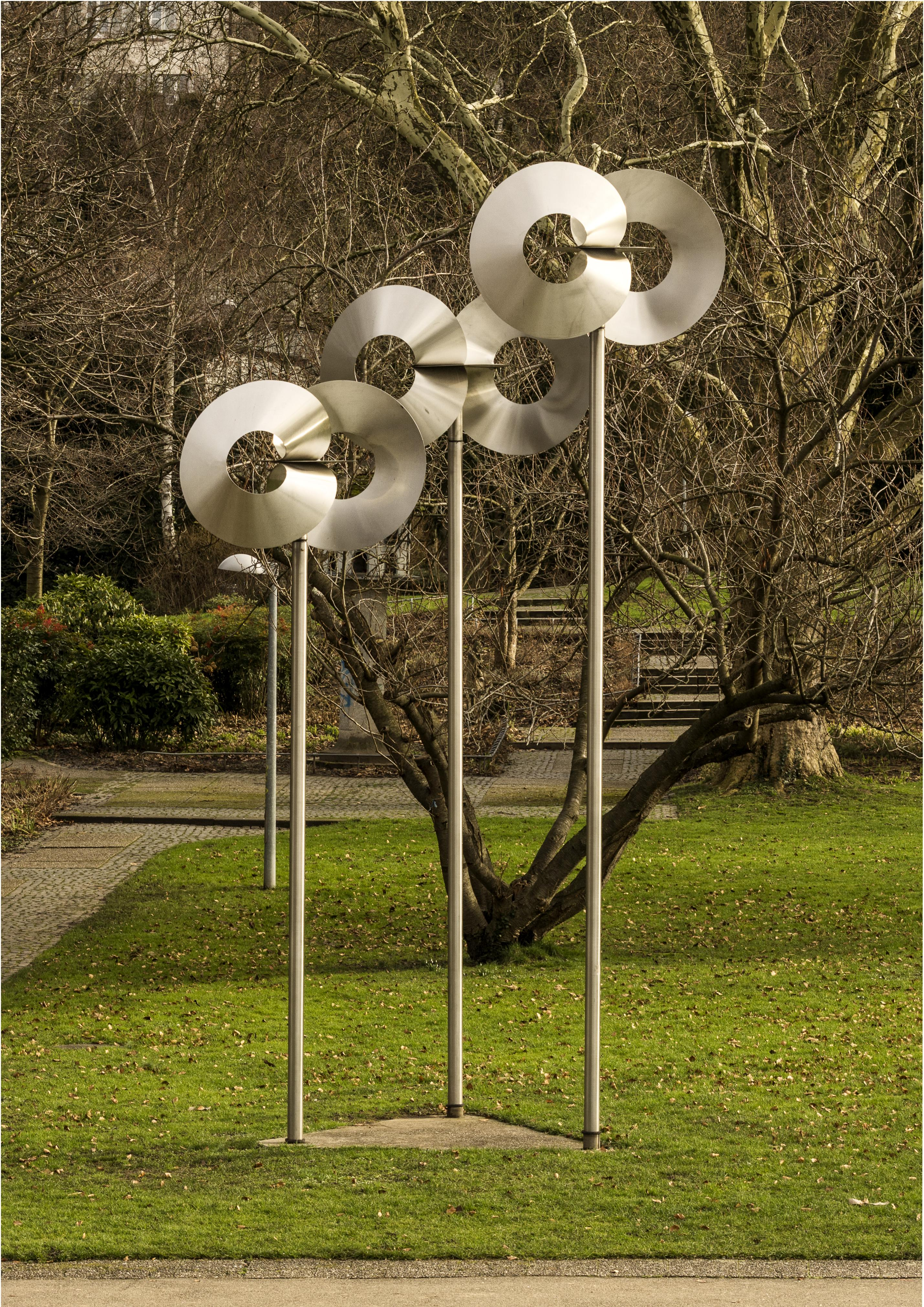
Roland Phleps: Windspiel

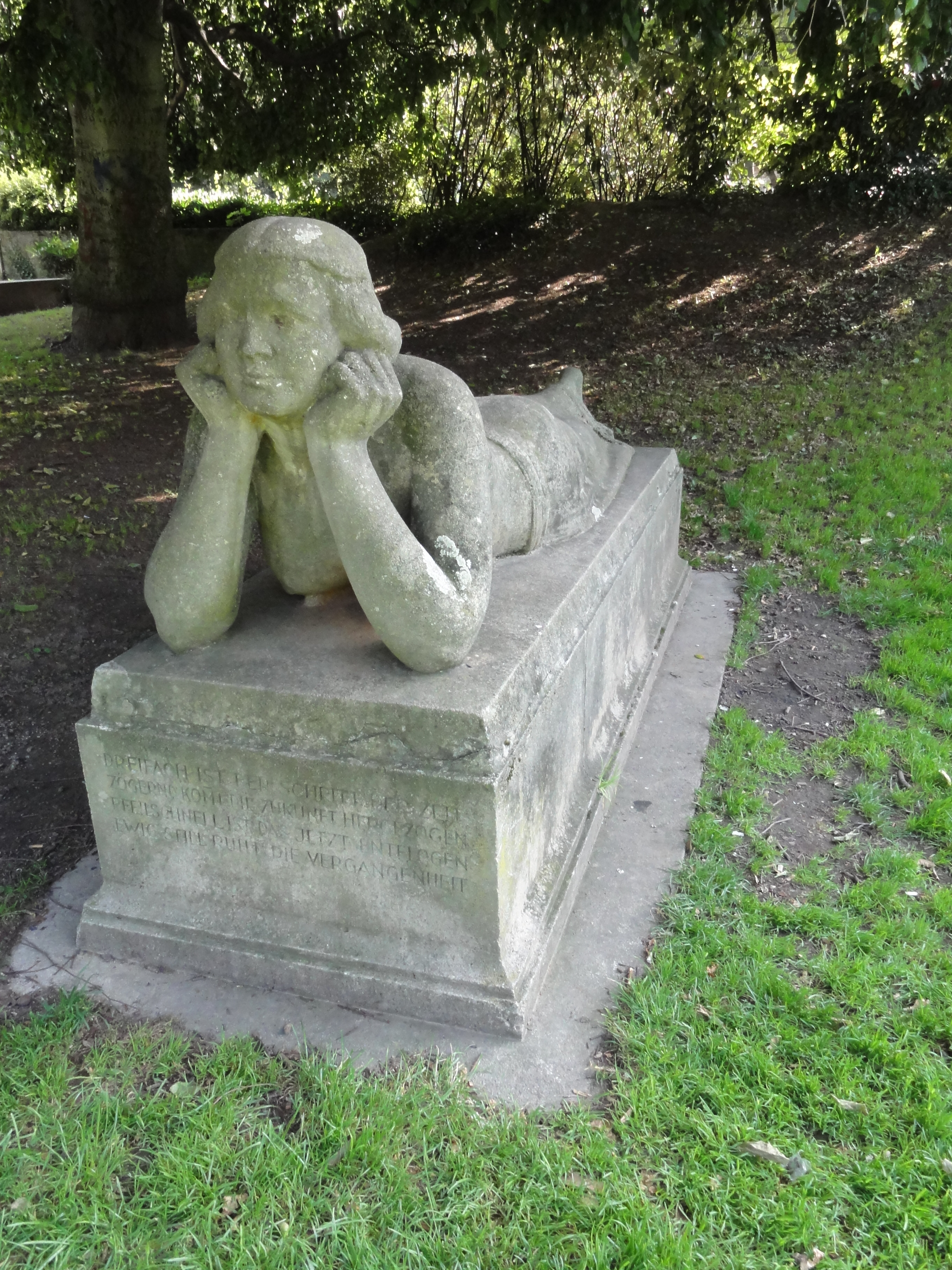
Richard Engelmann: Wartende (Waiting Woman)

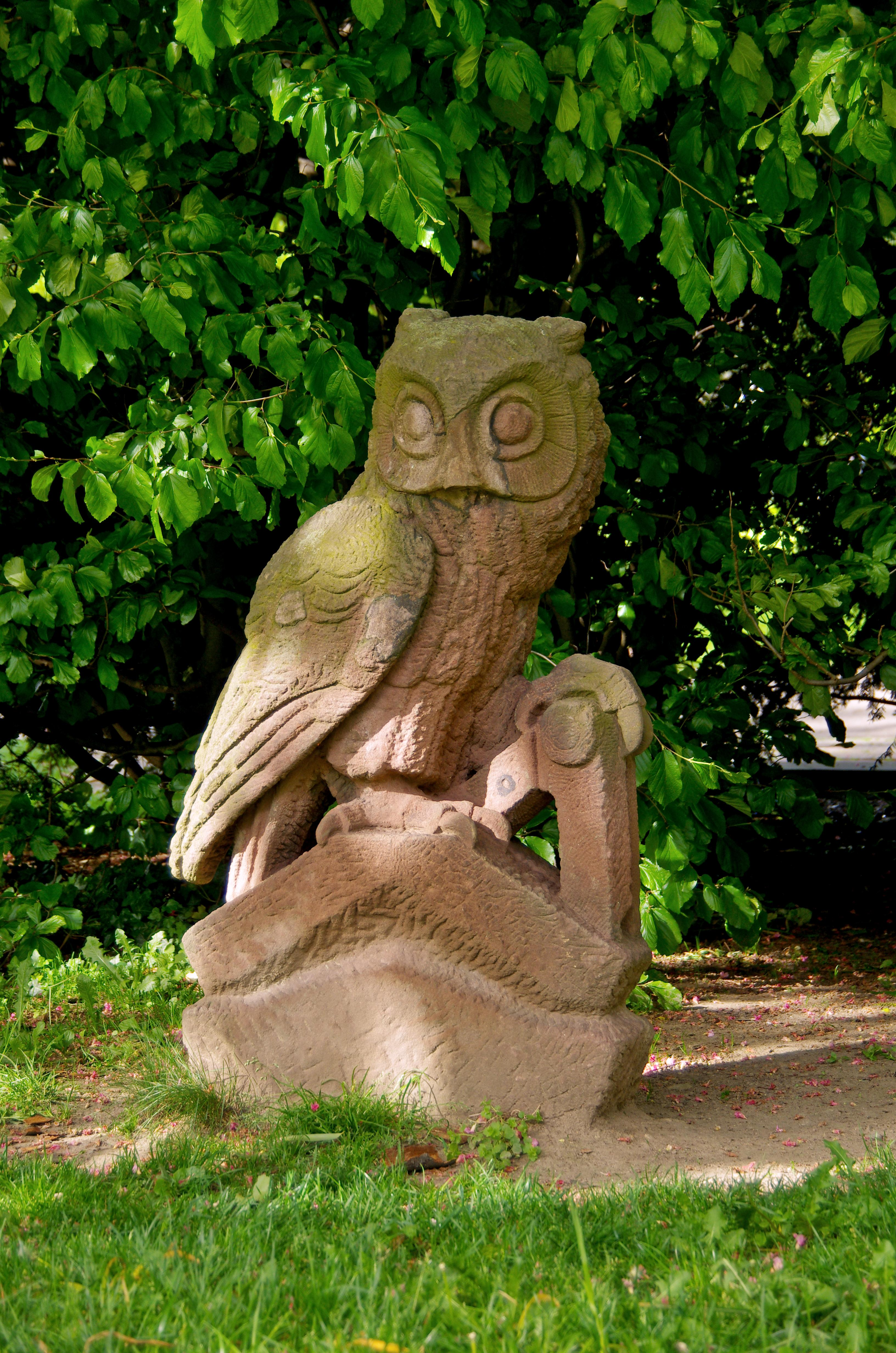
Eva Eisenlohr: Eule (Owl)

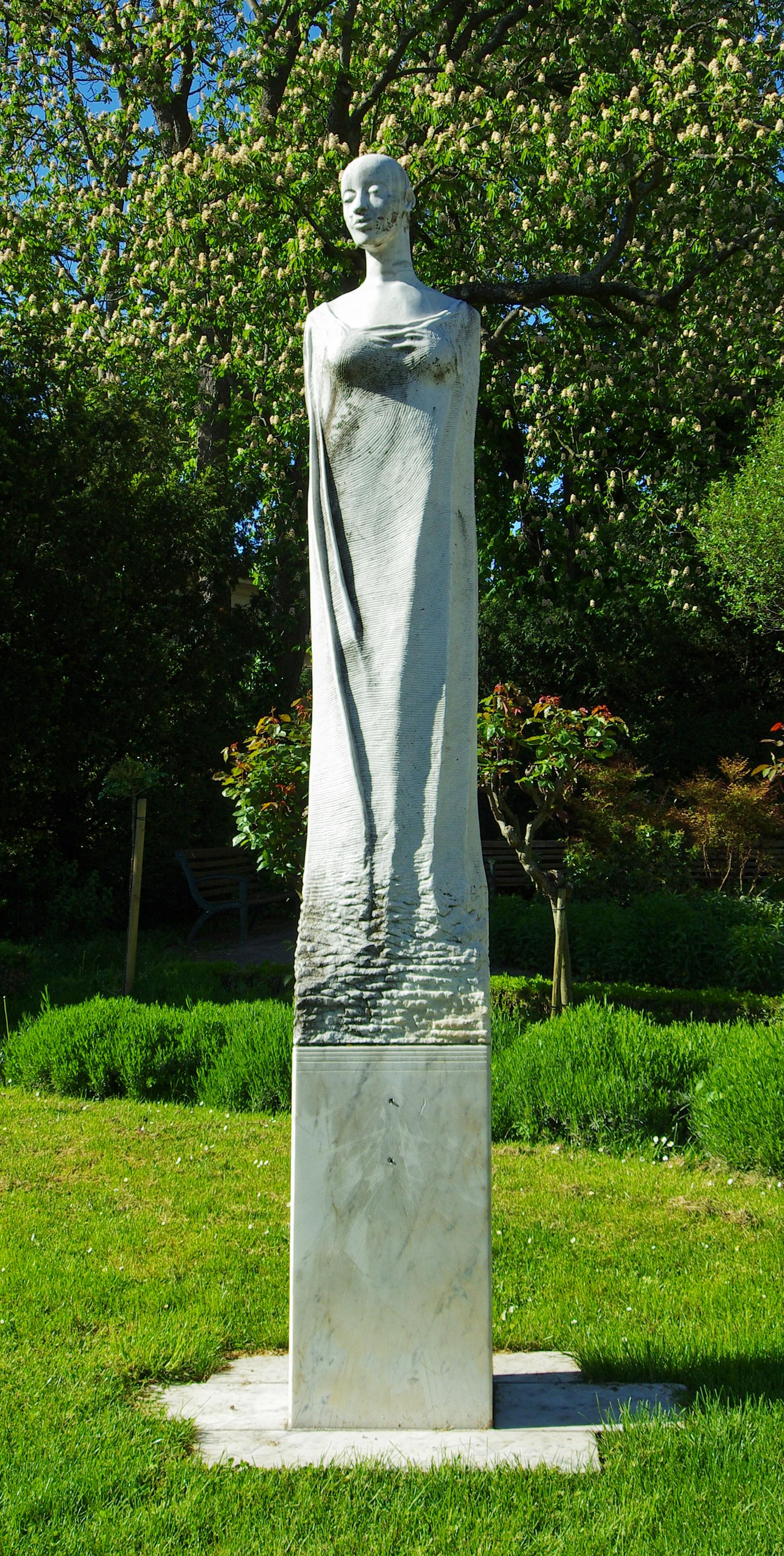
Till-Peter Otto: Illumina

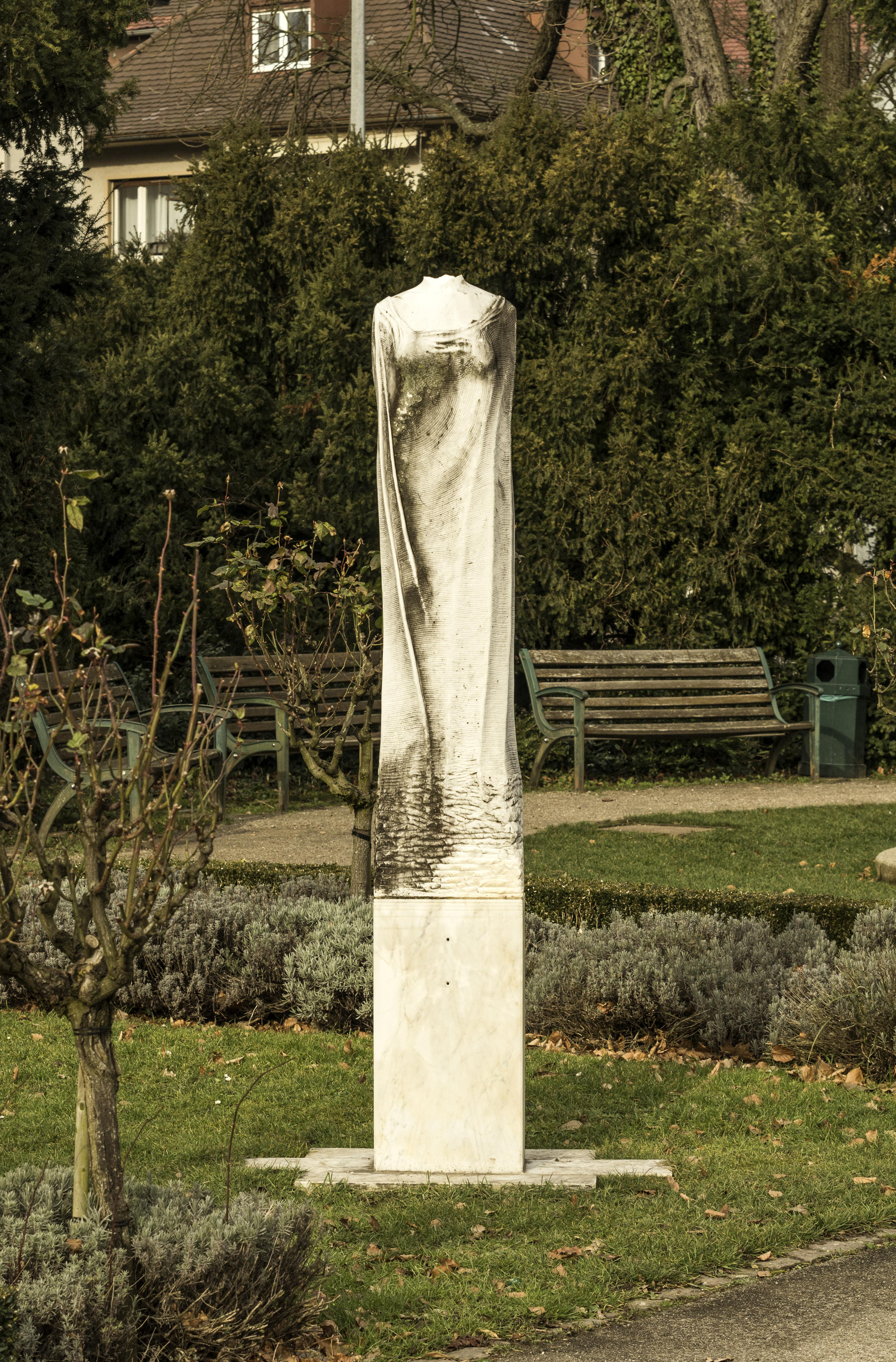
Die zerstörte Illumina

There are also several fountains in the Stadtgarten, including the east exit of Flötenspielerbrunnen by Arthur Bausenhart (1910–2005) dating from 1959.

On one of the ponds is a monument to the Freiburg Erpel, who managed to warn people before an air attack on Freiburg. Although this is not historically documented, the Erpel statue was commissioned in 1953 by the mayor of Freiburg, Wolfgang Hoffmann, and made by Richard Bampi.

== Sources ==
- Stadtgarten Freiburg Alemannische Seiten
- Stadtgarten Freiburg im Breisgau
- Der Freiburger Stadtgarten hat eine militärische Vergangenheit, Peter Kalchthaler, Badische Zeitung, 7 December 2012, retrieved 24 March 2013
