= Arlesheimer See =

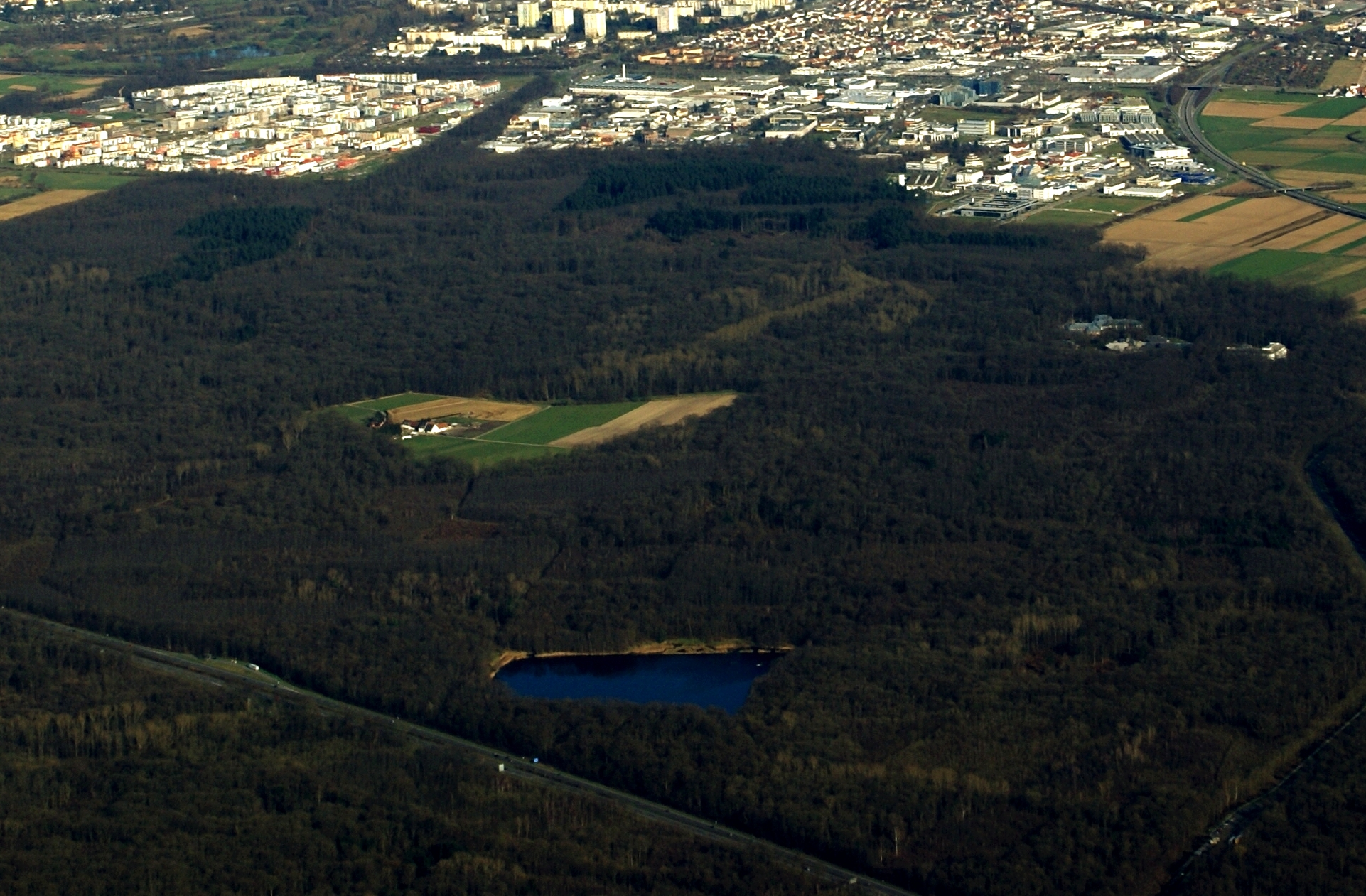
- Aerial view with surrounding forest

- Location within Baden-Württemberg

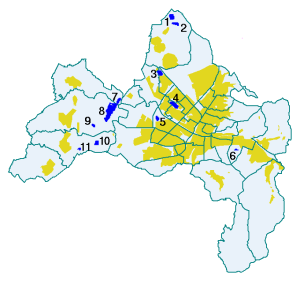
- (10 = Arlesheimer See)
- Location: Baden-Württemberg
- Coordinates: 47°59′8″N 07°44′44″E
- Type: artificial lake
- Primary inflows: none
- Primary outflows: none
- Basin countries: Germany
- Surface area: 0.060 km^{2} (0.023 sq mi)
- Surface elevation: 212 m (696 ft)

Arlesheimer See is an artificial lake within the boundaries of Freiburg im Breisgau district, in Baden-Württemberg, Germany. At an elevation of 212 m, its surface area is 0.060 km². It was first excavated in 1966. The lake, as well as 12 ha of forest surrounding it, is designated as a nature reserve, so the lake is not open for swimming. Due to the high number of found there, detected there, the lake is recognized as a European bird sanctuary under the Birds Directive.
