= Kaiser-Joseph-Straße =

Street in Freiburg im Breisgau, Germany

Coordinates: 47.9946°N 7.8497°E

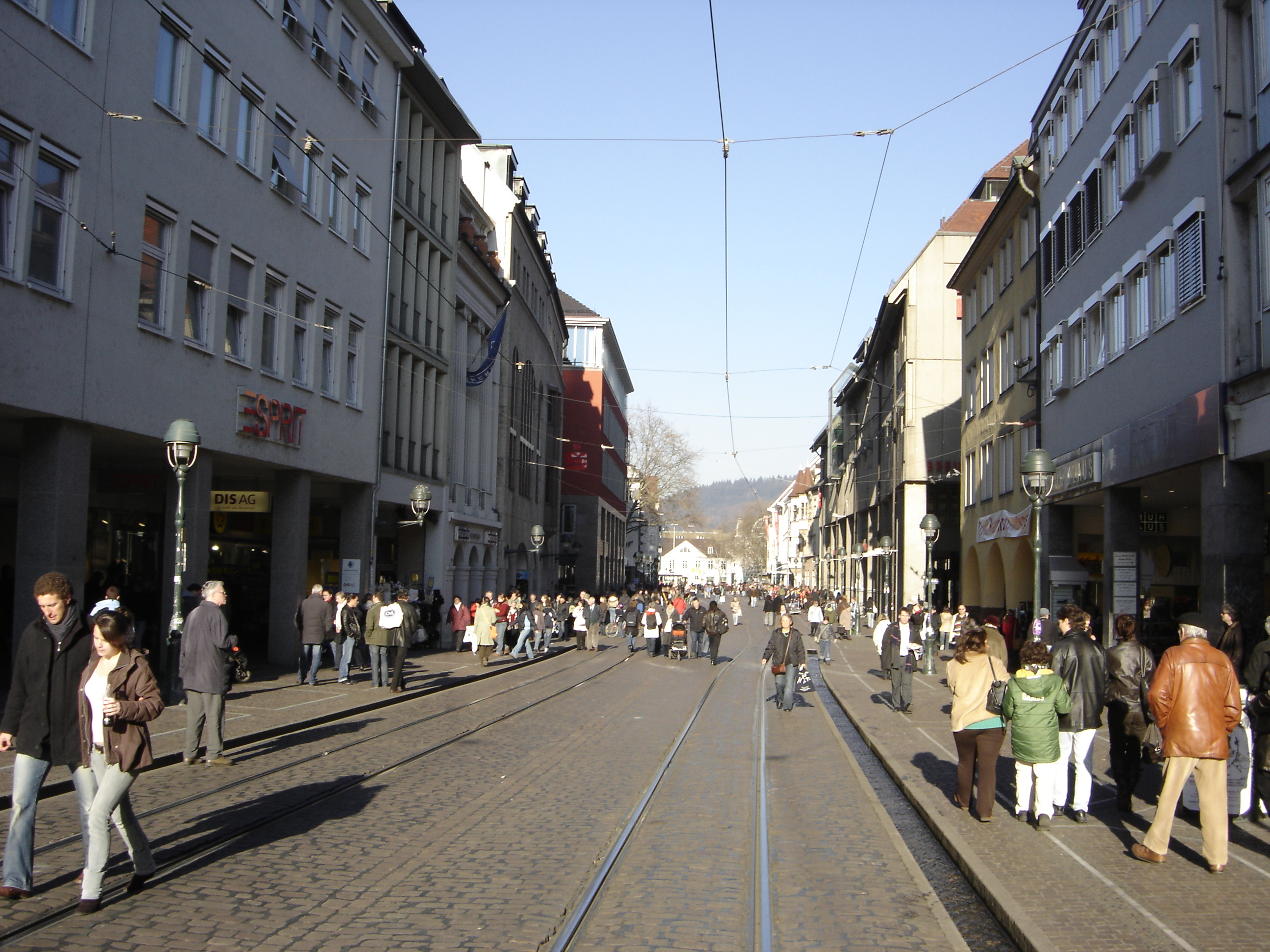
Kaiser-Joseph-Straße 2007, view to the north

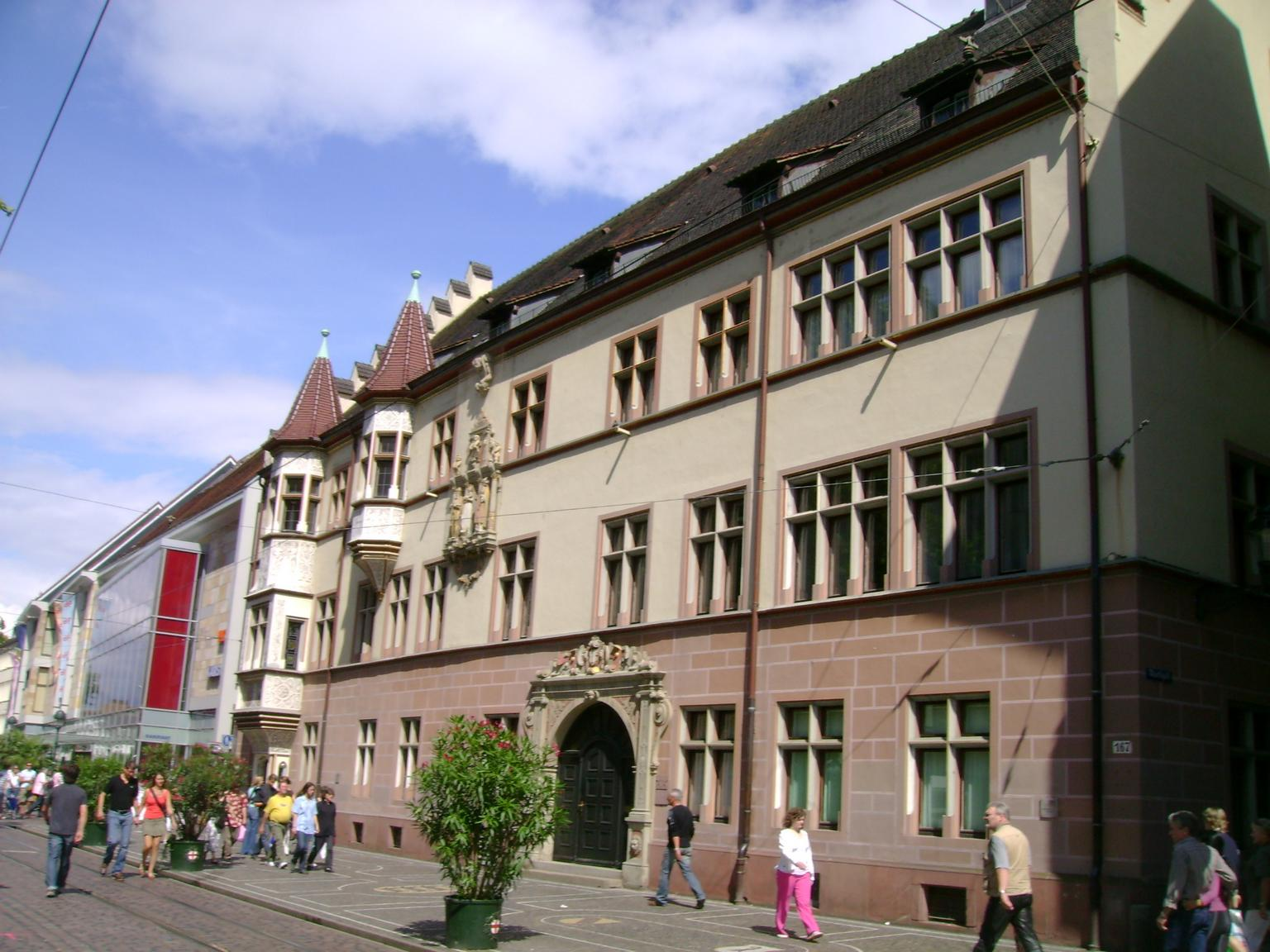
Basler Hof 2007

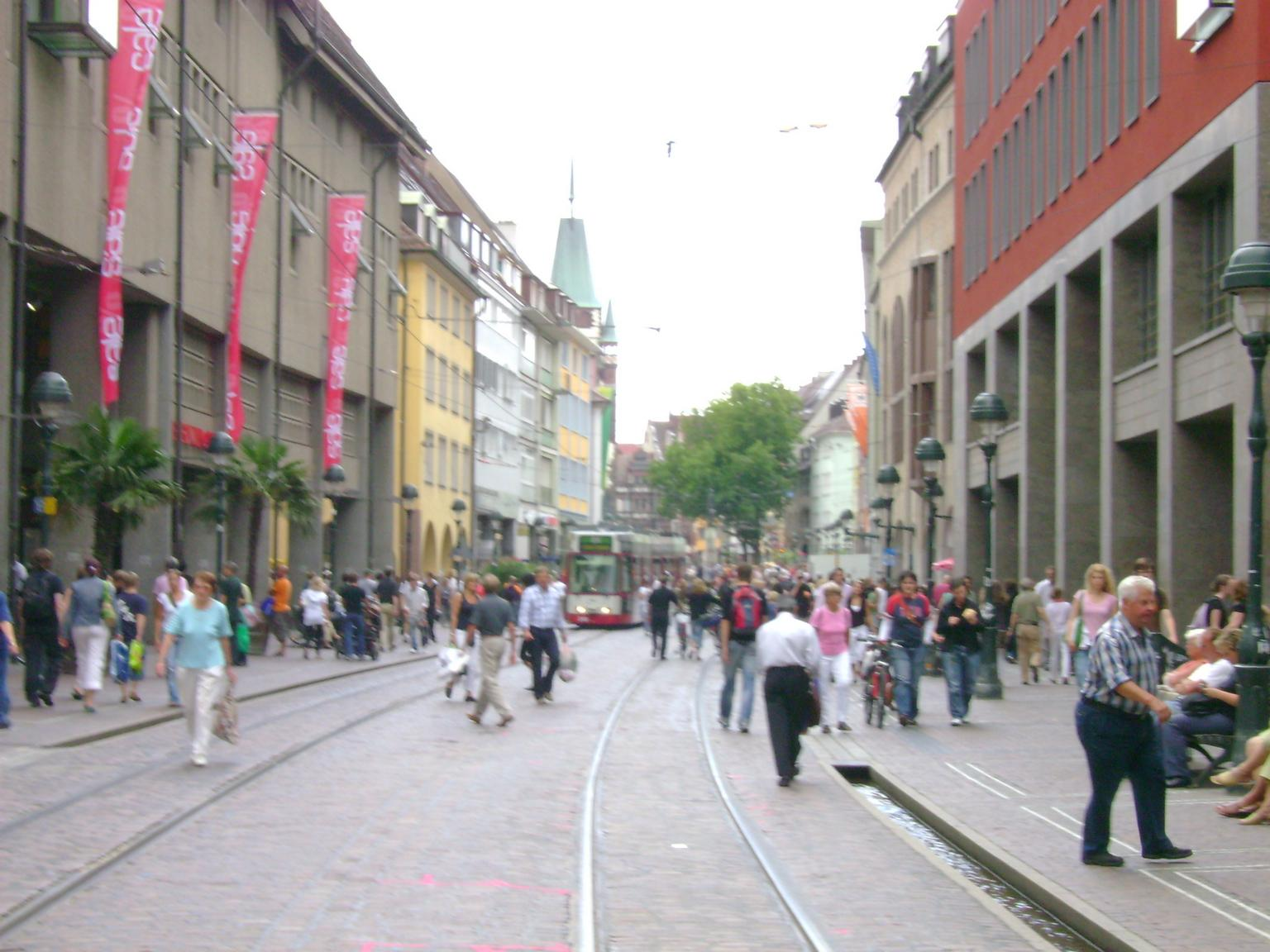
Kaiser-Joseph-Straße 2007, view to the south

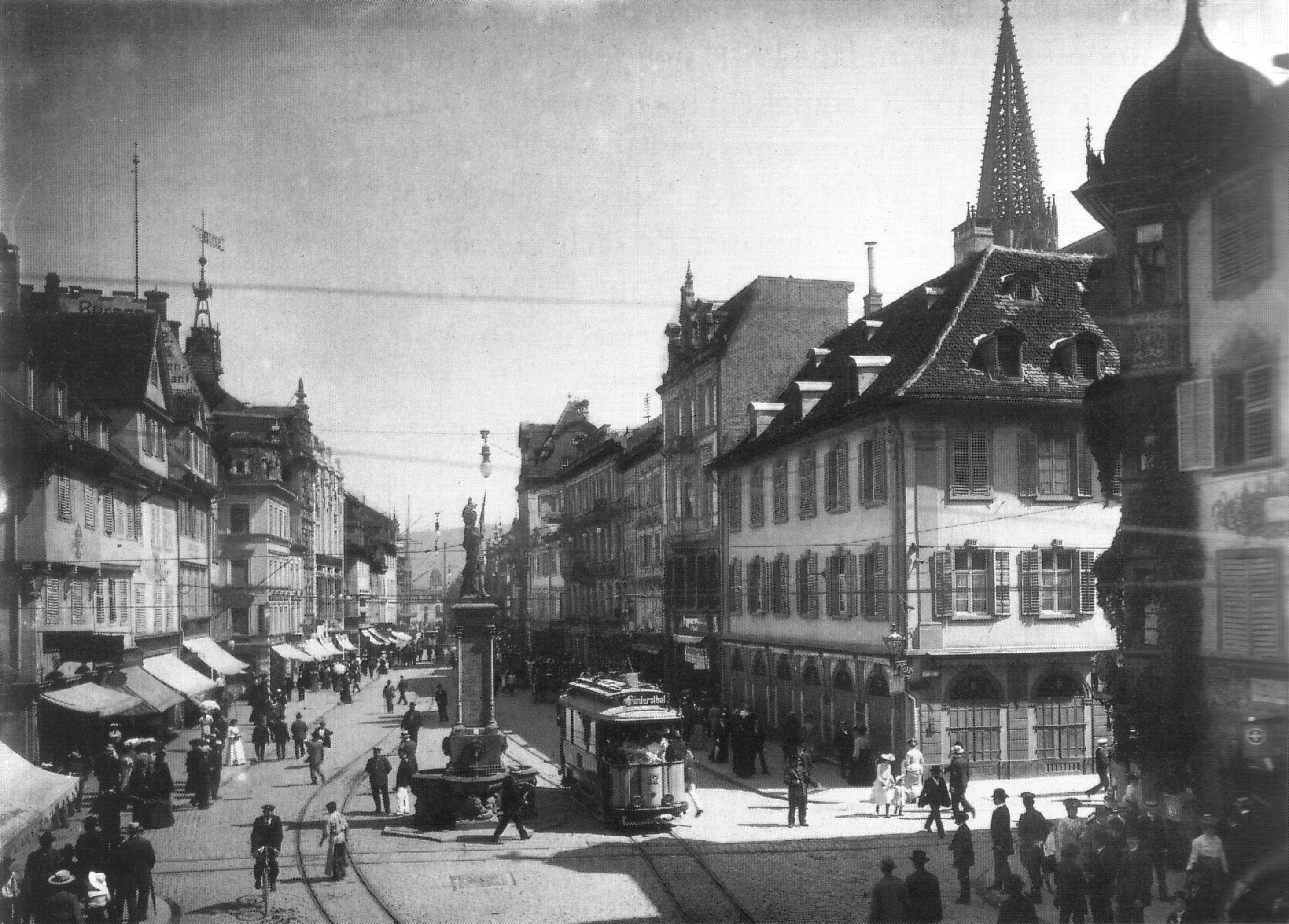
Kaiser-Joseph-Straße in 1904

The Kaiser-Joseph-Straße (German pronunciation: [kaɪzɐˈjoːzɛfˌʃtʁaːsə]; often shortened to Kajo) in Freiburg im Breisgau is a shopping street of about 900 meters, which runs through the center of Freiburg's historic downtown from north to south. It is one of the most expensive locations in Germany.

== Location and traffic ==
The street begins in the north of Freiburg at Siegesdenkmal, which is located on the outskirts of the historic city center. From the central street crossing, at Bertoldsbrunnen, Bertoldstraße branches off westwards and Salzstraße eastwards. On the southern outskirts of the historical city center Kaiser-Joseph-Straße passes through the Martinstor gate and continues on to Kaiserbrücke, which crosses the Dreisam. Like many other streets in downtown Freiburg, Kaiser-Joseph-Straße has a Bächle. Most of the buildings between Siegesdenkmal and Martinstor were completely destroyed in World War II during an air raid on 27 November 1944. Because of the tram, which opened in 1901, the people in charge had to build arcades into the buildings on either side of the street in order to create more space for pedestrian and other traffic, so the tram could continue passing through the Kaiser-Joseph-Straße. Traffic was regulated by traffic lights located at Bertoldsbrunnen. In November 1972, the street became one of the first traffic-calmed areas for pedestrians in Germany. Only tramline 2 (Zähringen-Günstertal), tramline 3 in the south (Vauban-Haid), as well as tramline 5 (Rieselfeld-Hornusstraße) and certain delivery vehicles are allowed to use this street now. These restrictions do not affect the part of Kaiser-Joseph-Straße which is located south of Martinstor.

== History ==
The Kaiser-Joseph-Straße was originally called the "Große Gass" (big alley), where a weekly market was held in medieval times. This is the reason for the great width compared to other streets in historic downtown. In the 15th century the weekly market was relocated to the area in front of the Freiburg Minster.

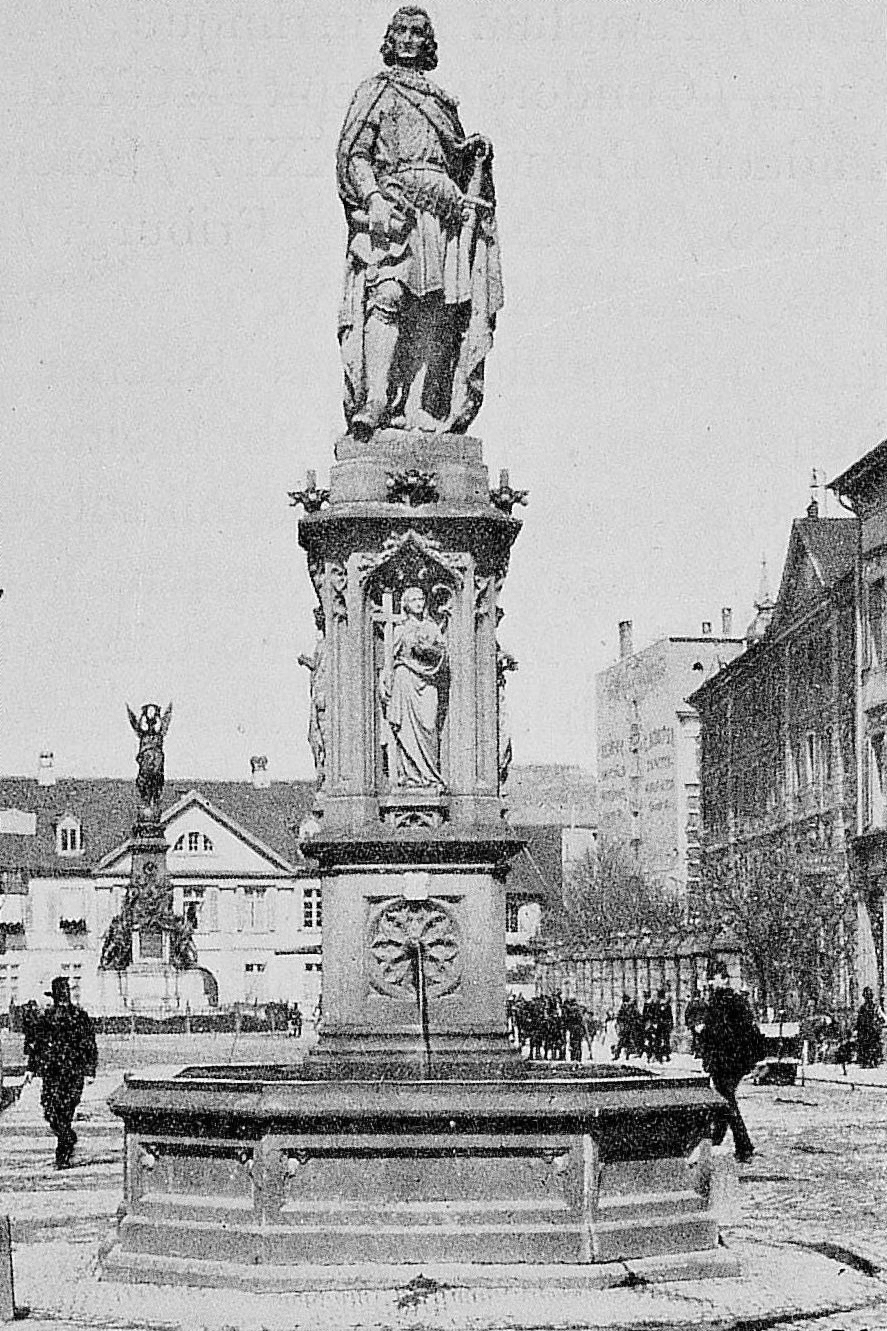
The Albert-Ludwig-Brunnen in front of the Siegesdenkmal, 1868

The connection between the "Große Gass" and the settlements outside the city walls – in the form of the Martinstor – was severed in the 17th century when Sébastien Le Prestre de Vauban had the city fortified and the settlements outside the city walls leveled. Salzstraße was then used as an access road from Höllental. For the bridal procession of the future French Queen Marie Antoinette, consisting of 235 people, 57 wagons and 250 draft and saddle horses, however, the street was not wide enough. In order to give her a welcome which befitted her social status in spite of this, it was decided that she was to enter the city through the gateway called Breisacher Tor via Gartenstraße on 4 May 1770. For this reason two new streets, "Dreisamstraße" and "Schreiberstraße", were built on the northern bank of the Dreisam. Three arcs of triumph were constructed in honor of the Dauphin of France by three of the city’s greater organisations: one by the City of Freiburg erected at the "Karlskaserne", barracks near the town; one by the University where what is today the Old City Hall (Altes Rathaus) and one by the representation of the estates of the realm on "Große Gass". The latter was the biggest of them, measuring 24 meters in height and 18 meters in width. The arc was constructed by Johann Christian Wentzinger, using only wood and plaster. Marie Antoinette stayed at the Kageneckschen House, a locally well-known landmark, on Salzstraße, right before moving on to Schuttern Abbey on the morning of May 6.

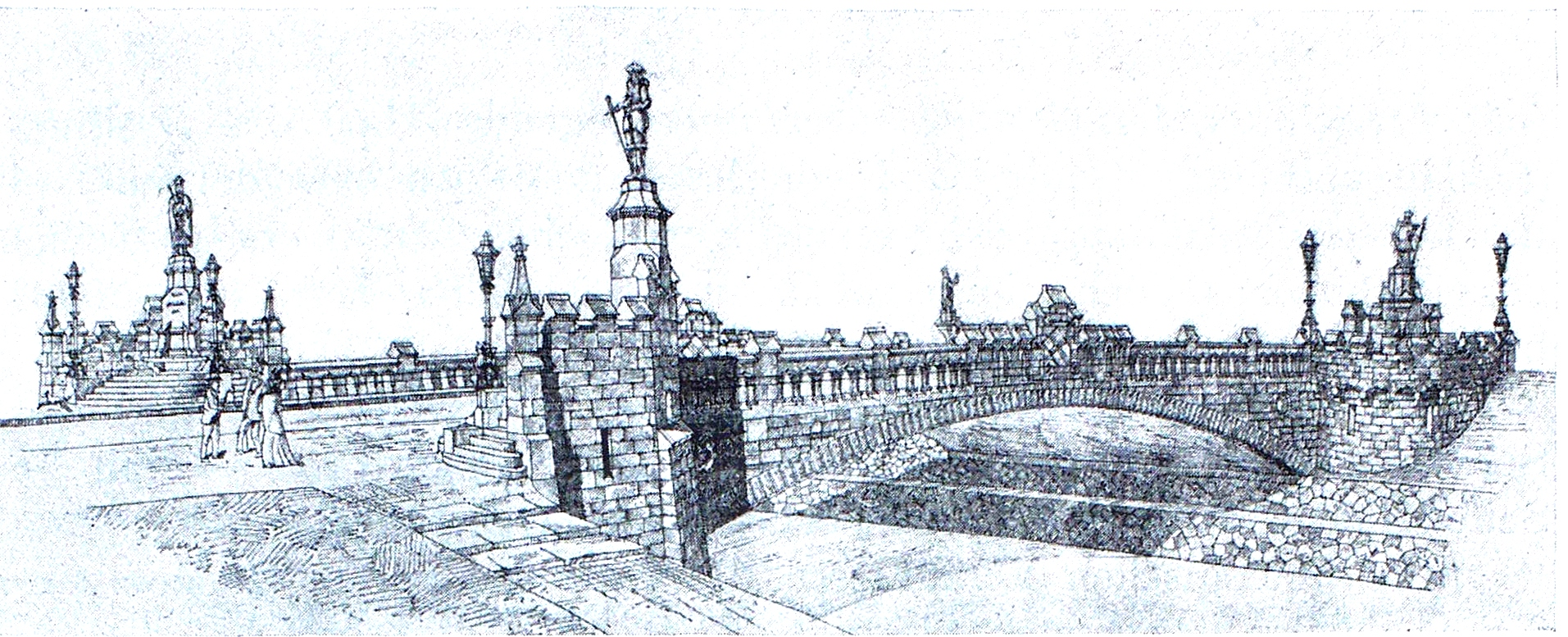
Sketch of the construction plans for the Kaiserbrücke

After a visit from Joseph II in 1777, the thoroughfare was renamed "Kaiserstraße" in his honor. Around 1840, the thoroughfare was extended southwards, starting from the Martinstor down to the Dreisam. This section was initially named "Stephanienstraße" in honor of Stéphanie de Beauharnais, Grand Duchess of Baden. As a result, the new quarter built in this context was named "Stephanien-Vorstadt". At the turn of the century, there were two wells on the thoroughfare: the "Fischbrunnen" (German for "Fish Well") from the 16th century, which was superseded by the Bertoldsbrunnen in 1806, and the Albert-Ludwig-Brunnen by Josef Alois Knittel from 1868. It was located close to the Siegesdenkmal on the former Kaiser-Wilhelms-Platz.

During the time of National Socialism the entirety of the Kaiserstraße, including its extensions to the north (Zähringerstraße) and to the south (Günterstalstraße), was renamed Adolf-Hitler-Straße. After the Second World War the part that led from the city center to the Dreisam was called Kaiser-Joseph-Straße, while the northern part of the former Adolf-Hitler-Straße was given the name of Habsburgerstraße, in reference to the Habsburg descent of the emperor. In order to keep the established house numbers, however, today they start at 143 on the east side and at 166 on the west side of the Kaiser-Joseph-Straße.

Numerous branches of big trading companies own offices on this street. In the 1970s there were five department stores here, at the beginning of the 21st century only two remained. Basler Hof, which was built by Konrad Stürtzel as a residence in the 15th century, is the only building without any commercial use nowadays. It is one of the most important secular buildings in Freiburg. The name derives from the Basel cathedral chapter who used the residence from 1587 to 1677 when they were forced to relocate to Freiburg as a result of the Reformation in their home town. It currently serves as the representative official residence of Freiburg's district president.

The Kaiser Bridge, which originates from the turn of the century and is located at the other end of the Kaiser-Joseph-Straße, used to be decorated with bronze statues of the Salian Henry V. and Frederick Barbarossa of the House of Hohenstaufen, created by Julius Seitz, as well as statues of Rudolf of Habsburg and Maximilian I., by Fridolin Dietsche. In 1942 they were dismantled and taken to Hamburg to be melted down. Although this did not happen until the war had ended, the municipal council voted down a potential recall of the statues in 1950 because of the potentially substantial transport costs. The statues' foundations can still be seen today.
