= Kronenbrücke =

Coordinates: 47.9905°N 7.8447°E

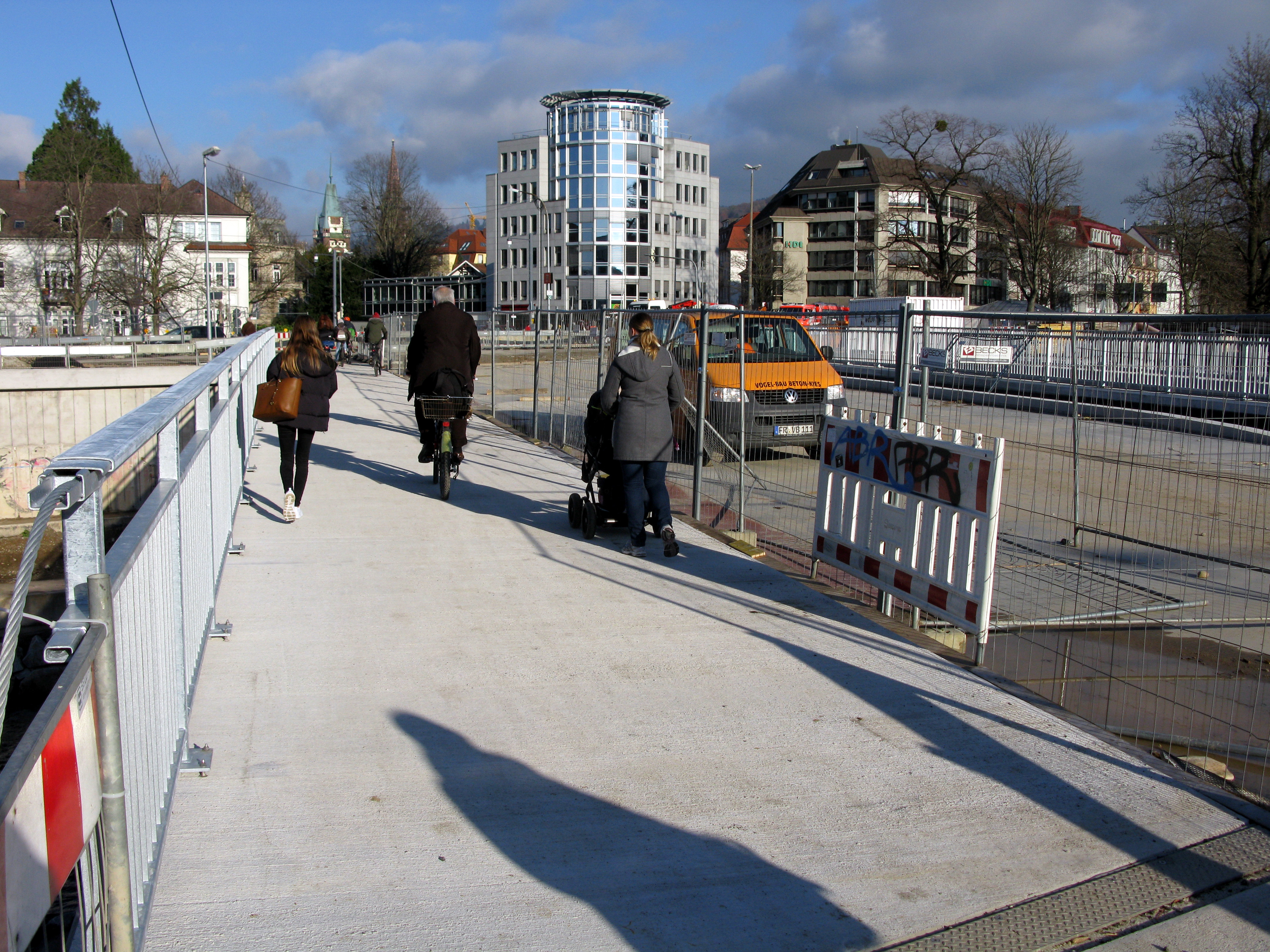
Kronenbrücke (2017) awaiting phase 2 construction.

The Kronenbrücke was built on the site of the original bridge which crossed the Dreisam and was one of the two oldest bridges in Freiburg im Breisgau, a city on the edge of the Black Forest in the Baden-Württemberg region of Germany. In 1869, an iron bridge with stone substructure replaced the original wooden bridge across the River Dreisam. This, however, lasted only three years due to excessive flooding and the replacement erected was Gartenstraßen. After extensive work was done to dams and shores to prevent the bridge collapsing in the manner of its predecessor and the building of two others, to reduce frequent stressing, the now renamed Friedrichsbrücke, named after Grand Duke Frederick, opened in 1903. Despite hopes of the bridge lasting for centuries, it was replaced due to a variety of reasons in 1962 with the removal of its base done in 1967, and final construction completed in 1969. The new bridge was the Kronenbrücke an oval-shaped twin bridge, enhancing traffic management and navigation on the inner city ring road. History was soon to be repeated as the current incarnation was unable to be modified to allow a planned tram line. The Kronenbrücke was demolished in 2015 to make way for a new economical bridge featuring a tram line. Its replacement, also called Kronenbrücke, has a simpler straight road guidance system which allowed a more economical bridge size.

== History ==
=== Wooden Footbridge (up to 1869) ===
In the Middle Ages, a wooden footbridge crossed the river at the site of today's bridge. It formed part of the trade route going from Frankfurt to Basel, which ran from Martinstor along the streets now known as Gartenstraße and Kronenstraße.

=== Gartenstraßenbrücke (1869–1903) ===
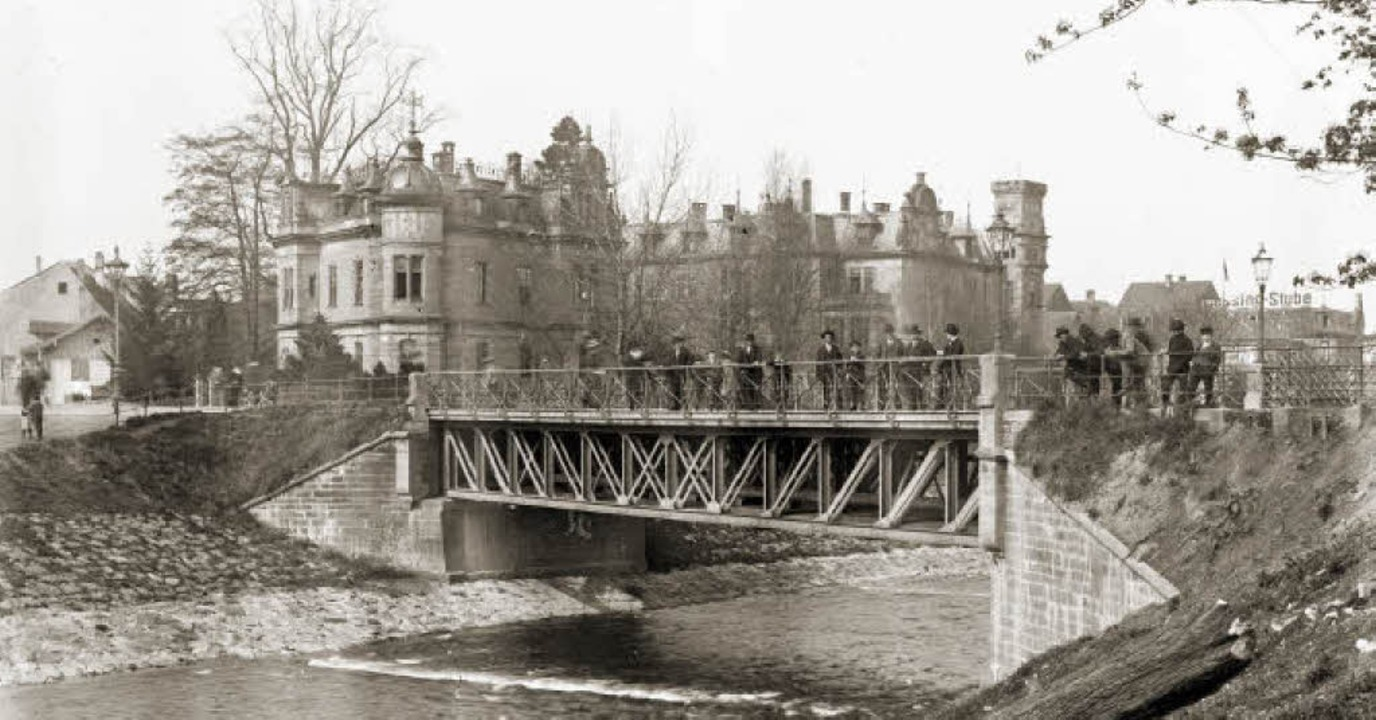
Gartenstraße Bridge

The wooden bridge was eventually replaced by an iron bridge with a stone foundation in 1869. However, it was not stable and had to be rebuilt three years later, after collapsing when the River Dreisam flooded. At the turn of the century, urban planners said increasing traffic meant the 10-metre-meter-wide (33 ft) bridge was too narrow. Although the Gartenstraßenbrücke was not heavily damaged by the 100-year flood of 1896, it did demonstrate that the bridge was not fit to drain large quantities of water and its base was partially washed away. The city council decided to renovate six crossings of the River Dreisam, including the Gartenstraßenbrücke, as well as investing in further river bank reinforcements.

=== Friedrichsbrücke (1903–1967) ===
The new bridge was opened in 1903 on the Golden Jubilee of Frederick I. It was named Friedrichsbrücke. It had cost 267,000 marks and had a width of 5 m (16 ft). Its three segments used the same abutment as the Gartenstraßenbrücke and adjoining road, but it was completely rebuilt. The new construction meant that any traffic-related tremors of the road would not affect the bridge's stability. The bridge's Jugendstil railing was made by the Armbrüster brothers. It featured ornate motifs of local trees and bushes, the branches of which descend down to the supporting arches of the iron bridge construction. The Grand Duke's coat of arms, and the city of Freiburg's coat of arms, were placed at the center of the railing. The end of the railings were decorated with large dragons, while the pillars holding the street lamps were decorated with lion heads made of white sandstone. In an allusion to these features, the bridge became colloquially known as the "mother-in-law bridge". The railings were removed and preserved until the bridge was reconstructed. They were later used in the reconstruction of the bridge renamed Schnewlinbrücke in 1977, using the local nickname for the bridge.

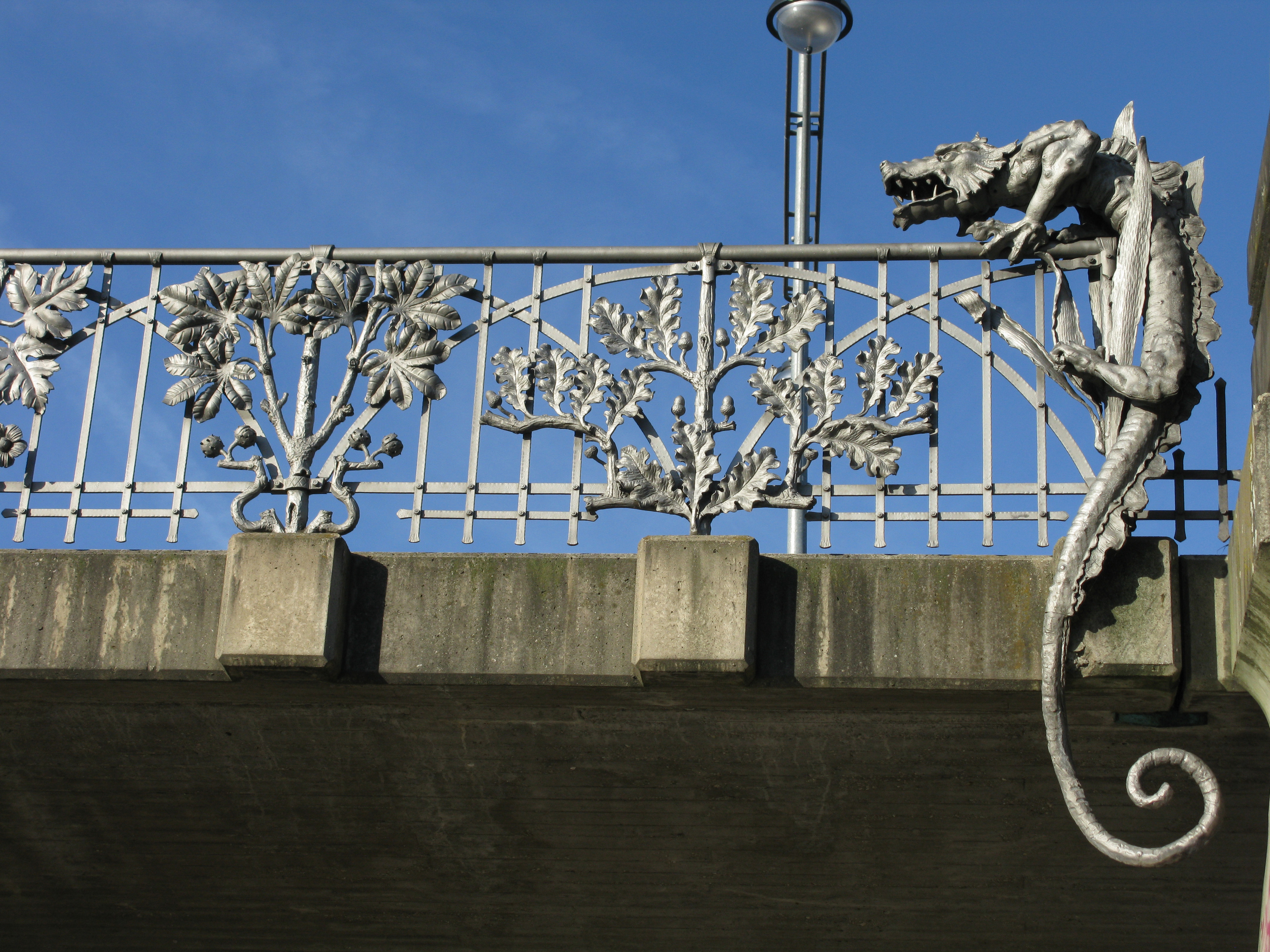
The Jugendstil railings with dragons on the Schnewlinbrücke

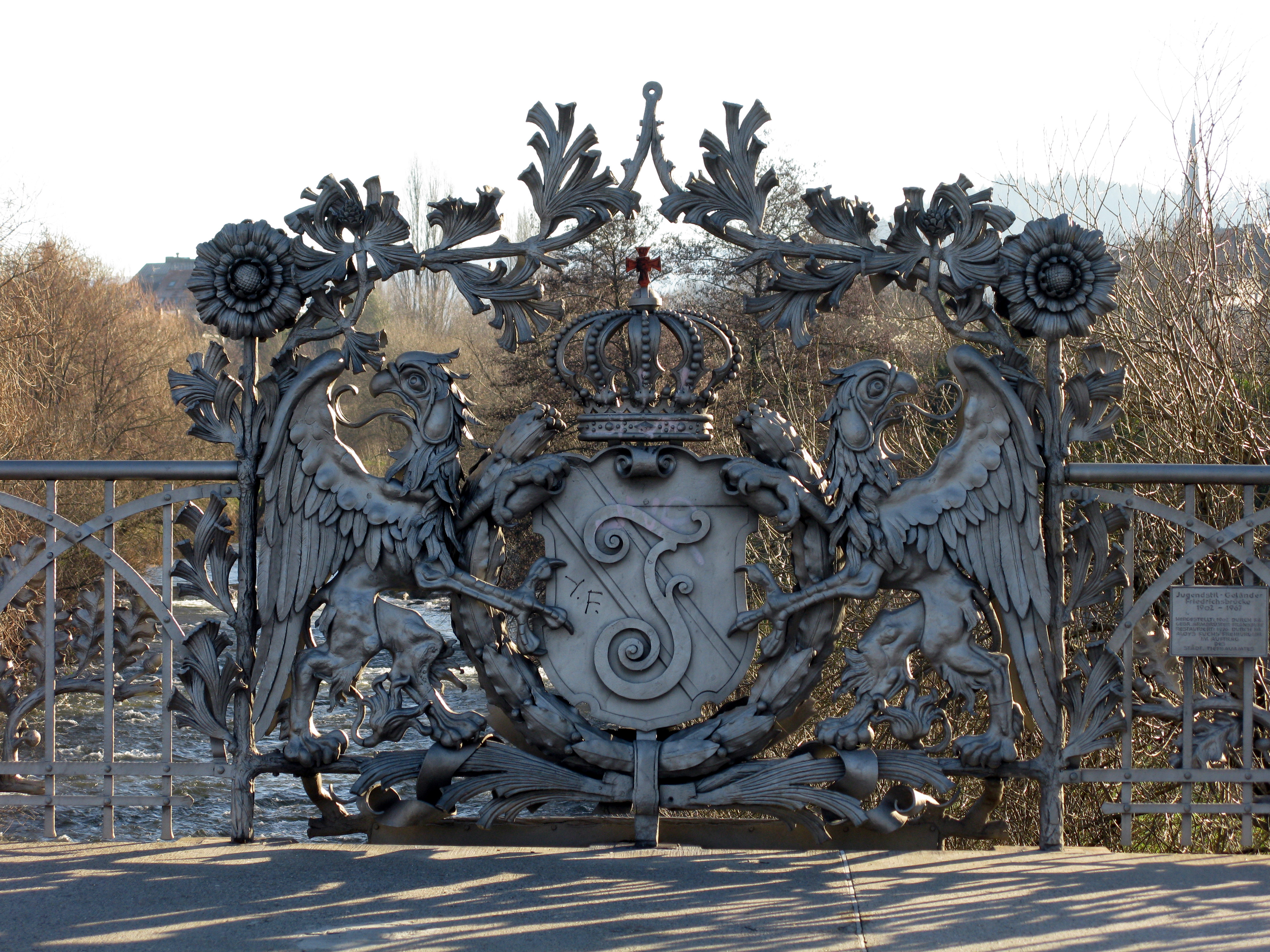
The coat of arms of the Grand Duke

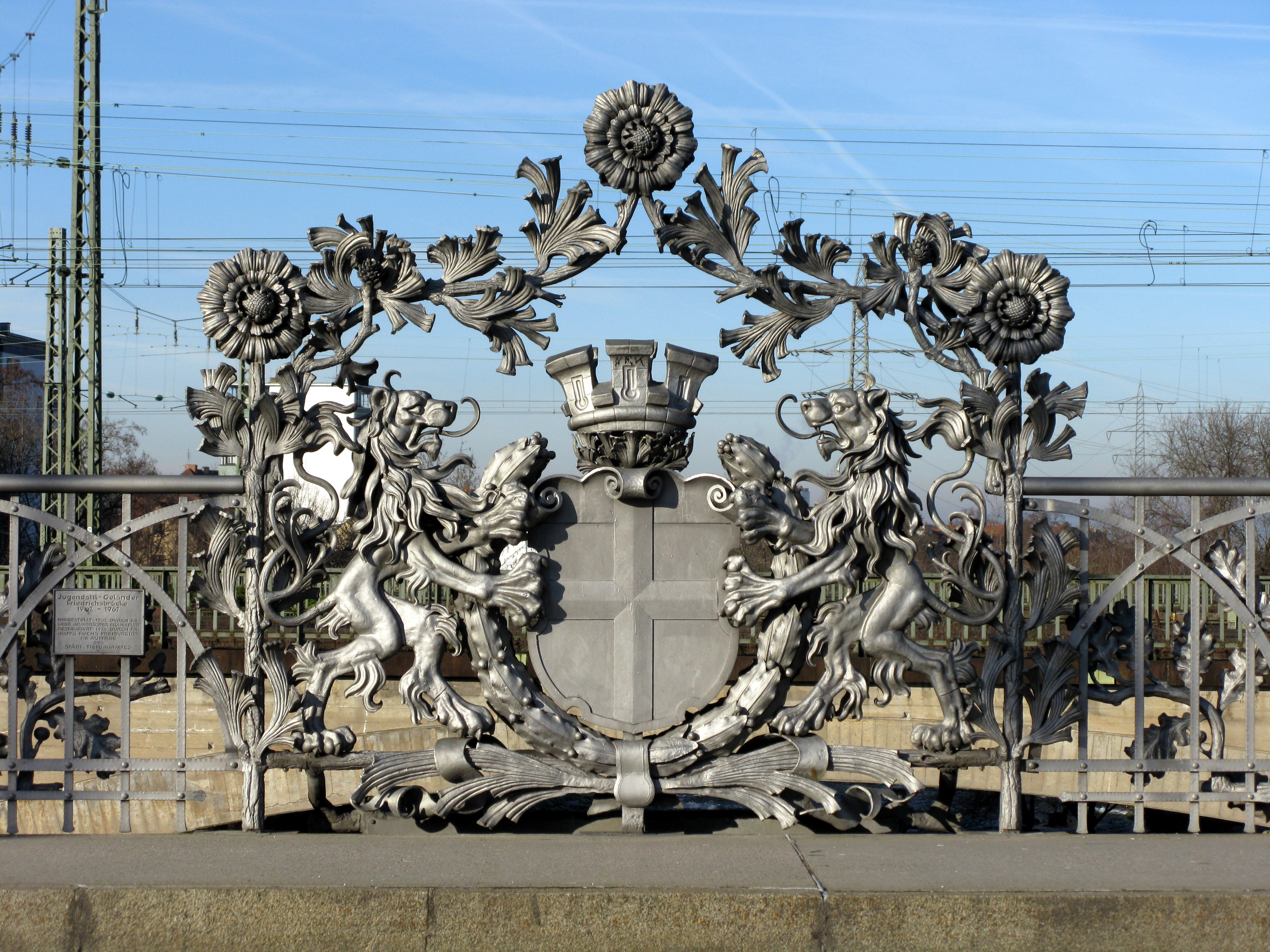
The city coat of arms

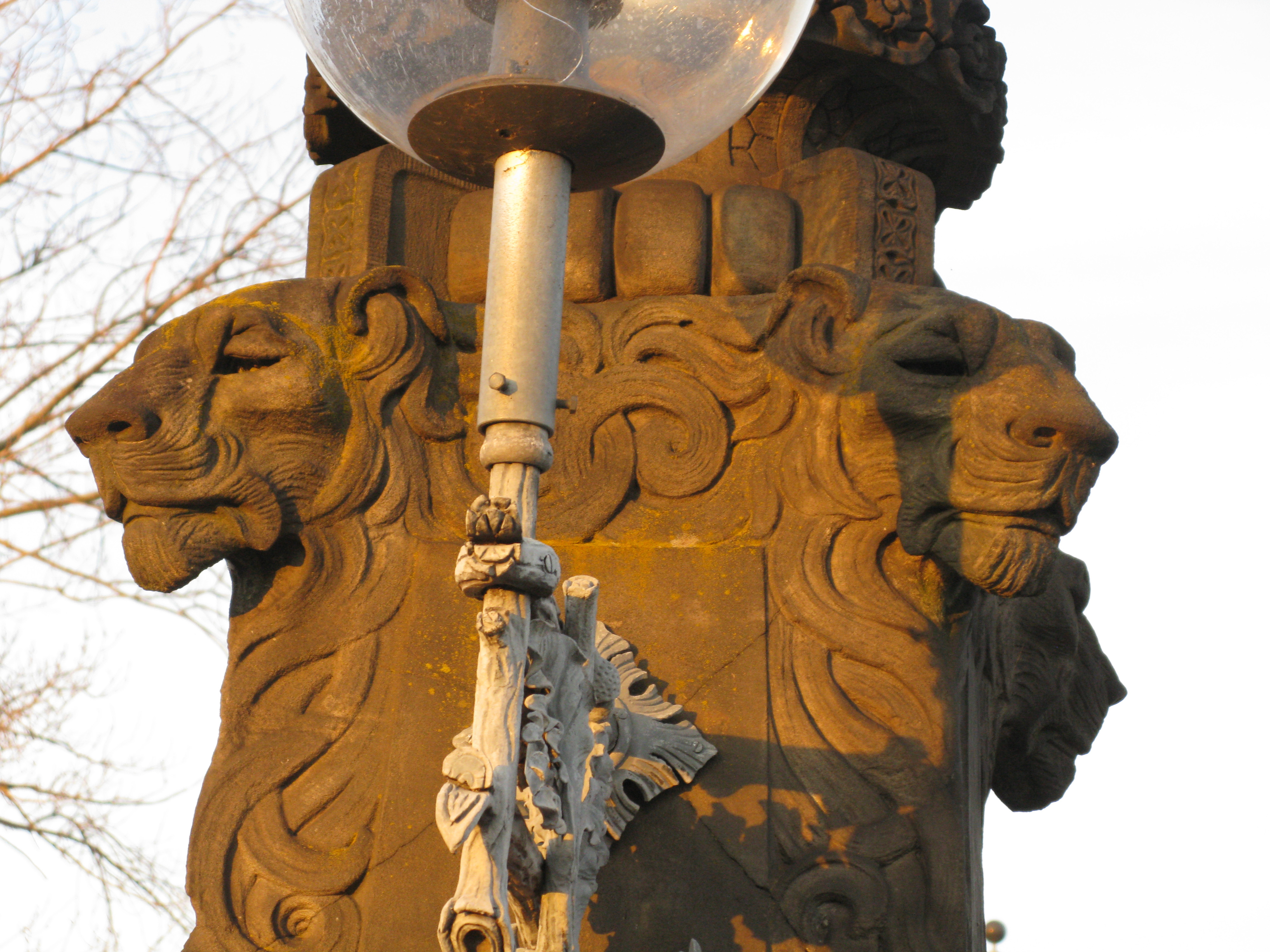
The pillars holding the street lamps with lion heads

=== Oval twin bridge (1967–2015) ===
In 1963, the city council decided to rebuild the bridge as an oval twin bridge. This was one of a number of projects to improve the accessibility of the city centre and make Freiburg a "car-friendly city", along with the construction of the B31 approach road and a four-lane expansion of Kronenstraße. The construction of the first bridge cost 1.4 million marks and was completed in 1967. It crossed the River Dreisam west of Friedrichsbrücke. Both bridges remained in use at the same time, until the city council also decided to rebuild Friedrichsbrücke, which suffered from corrosion and was too weak. This renovation, at a cost of 1.67 million marks, included a complete removal of the foundations. The complete twin bridge was eventually opened to traffic under the name Kronenbrücke in 1969. Due to its oval shape and size, it is also known colloquially as the "elephant loo".

== Demolition and Reconstruction ==
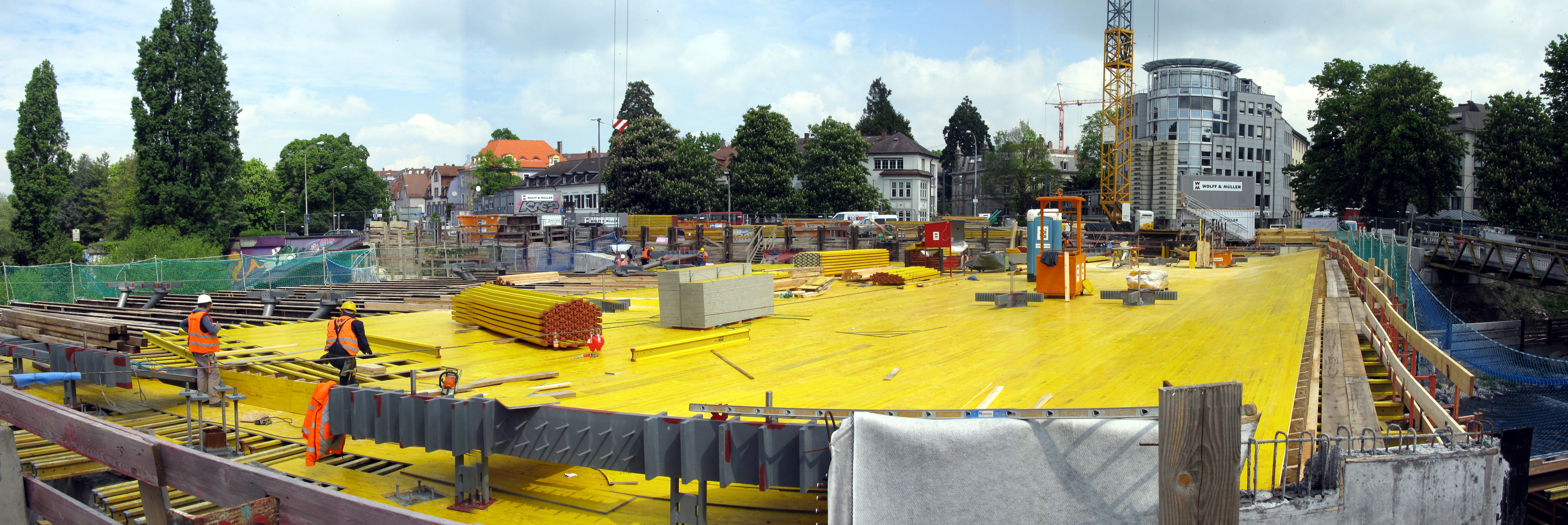
Formwork (April 2017)

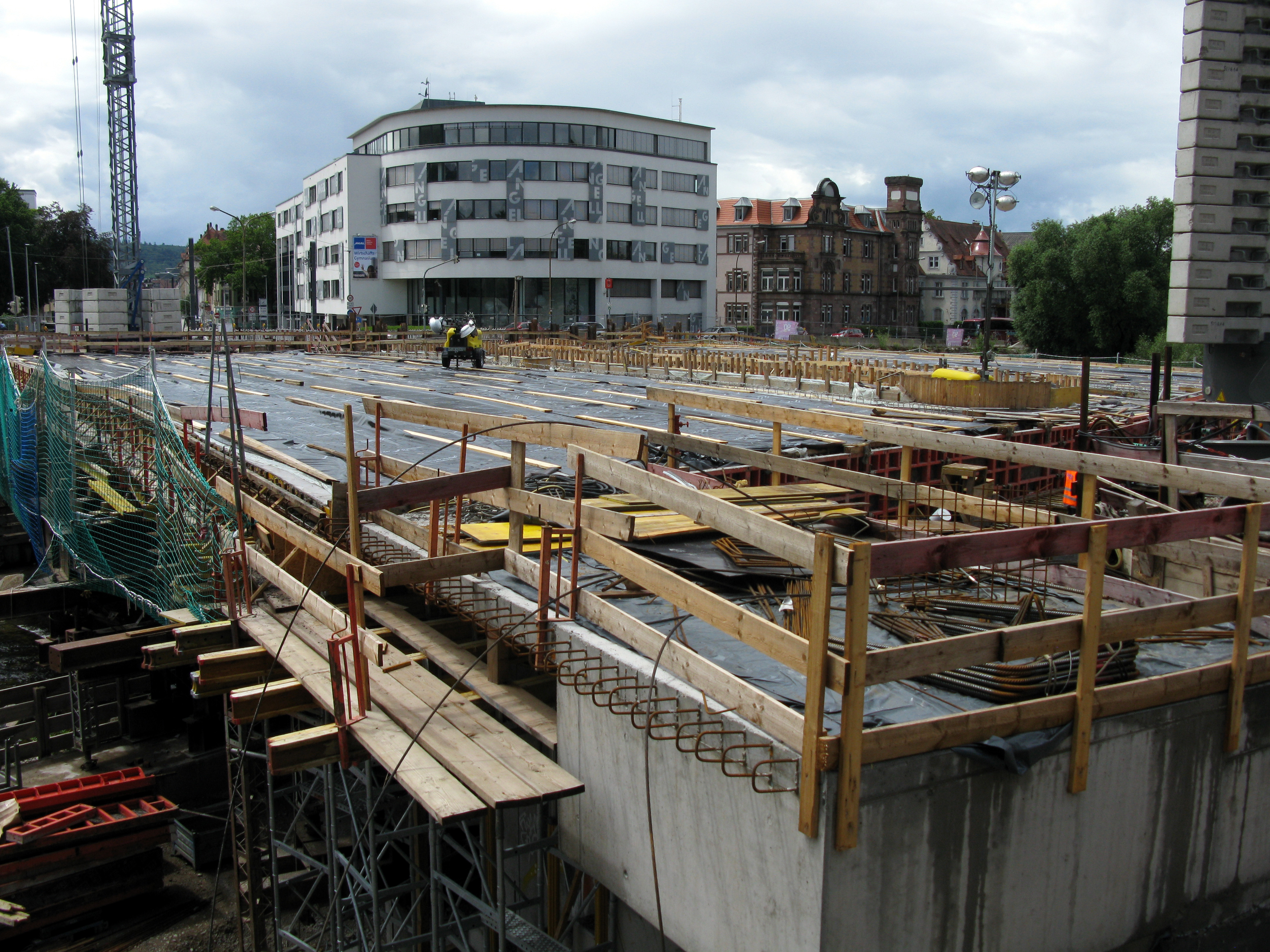
Drying concrete (Juni 2017)

In the course of the project to redevelop the city, it was agreed that Kronenbrücke was to be demolished, as for structural reasons it would not otherwise have been possible to lay new tram tracks across the bridge.

It was closed to motor vehicles on February 2, 2015. A temporary replacement bridge serving pedestrians and cyclists was opened to the public on June 22, 2015. Delays in demolishing and rebuilding the bridge since then have been due to a high-pressure gas pipeline and a miscalculation of the volume of the old bridge (1800 instead of 1100 cubic metres). Demolition of the bridge commenced in December 2015. The new bridge is to be finished by the end of 2018. With a delay of one year, the actual redevelopment works began in March 2017. The new bridge will no longer be made of prestressed concrete but instead of reinforced concrete with a steel support structure containing knots of crucible steel. This is unusual, given the expansion of 40 m^{2} (48 yd^{2}).

The opening in the middle of the bridge will not be oval like that of the previous bridge.

In March 2017, following the installment of the new abutments, two heavy-goods vehicles delivered each a steel triangle measuring 16 m (17 yd) long, 5.5 m (6.0 yd) wide, almost 4 m (4.4 yd) tall and weighing 25 tons from Steinach am Brenner. These triangles were put in place with a crane and welded into place with connecting tubes over the River Dreisam. Preparations of the formwork for concrete construction began in April 2017. It took 70 workers 13 hours during the night of June 27 to cast the concrete. 150 loads of ready-mix concrete, each weighing 20 tonnes and with a total volume of 1,200 m^{3} (1,600 yd^{3}), were used in the process. The work had originally been due to take place during the night of the June 21st, but high temperatures meant it had to be postponed for a week. The subsequent drying and hardening of the concrete took four weeks.
