= Bertoldsbrunnen =

Coordinates: 47.9949°N 7.8499°E

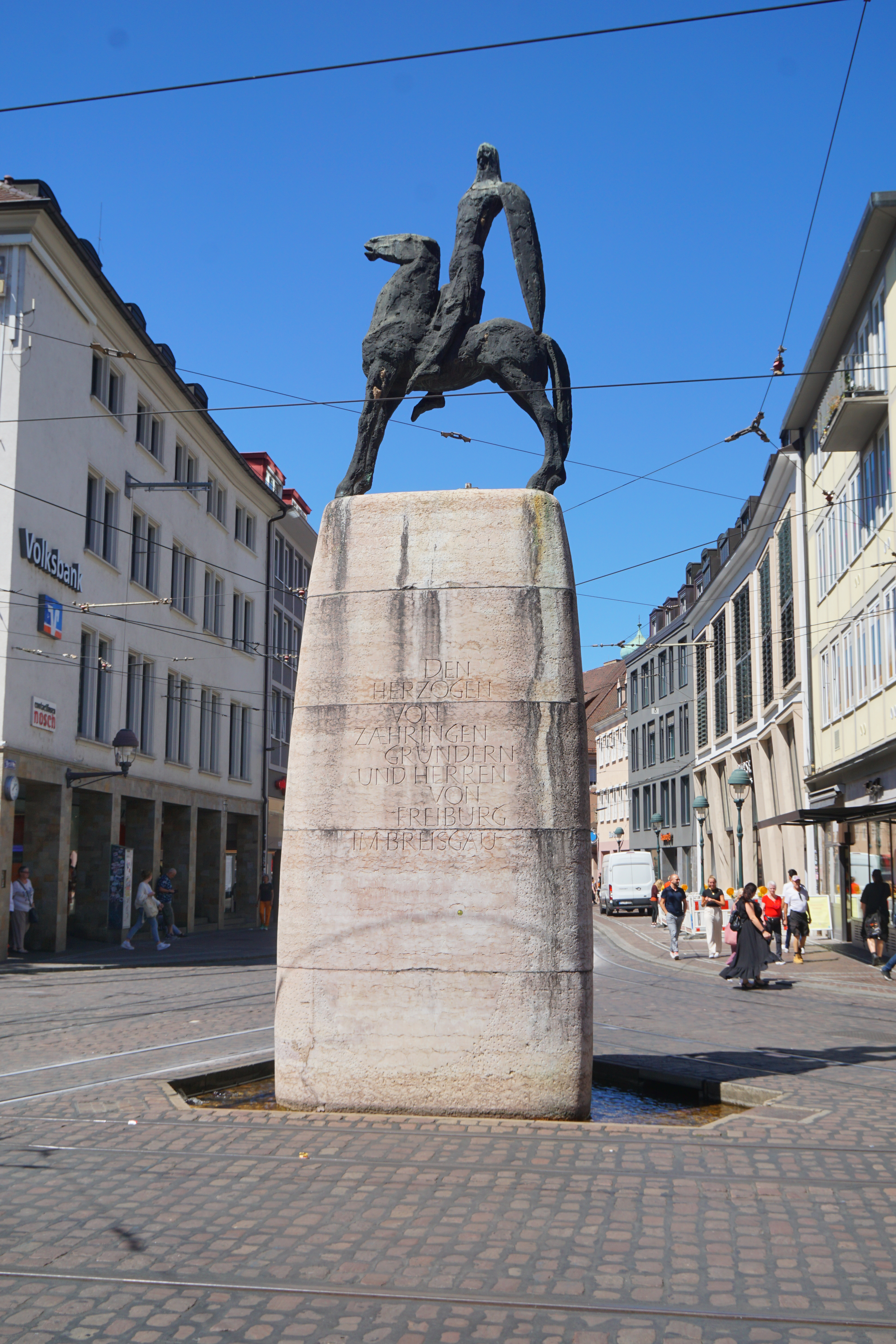
- The Bertoldsbrunnen in 2023
- Artist: Nikolaus Röslmeir
- Year: 1965
- Location: Freiburg im Breisgau, Baden-Württemberg, Germany

The Bertoldsbrunnen (German pronunciation: [bɛʁtɔltsˈbʁʊnən], "Bertold's Fountain") is a monument in the historic city of Freiburg im Breisgau. It is situated at the crossing of the Salz- and Bertoldsstraße with the Kaiser-Joseph-Straße. The fountain is one of the central locations of the city. A tram station with the same name is located at the Bertoldsbrunnen, where four of the five tramways of the Freiburger Verkehrs AG stop.

== History ==
The Fischbrunnen ("Fish Fountain") was situated at the crossing of the Kaiser-Joseph-Straße and the Salzstraße until 1806. It was then moved north to the Münsterstraße because a new fountain was to be constructed. As it was destroyed during World War II, a copy of the Fischbrunnen was built on the northern side of the Minster Square.

The new fountain at the crossing of the Salzstraße and Kaiser-Joseph-Straße was built in 1807 in remembrance of May 5, 1806, when Freiburg swore its oath to the new territorial lord, the prince-elector Karl Friedrich von Baden, who was promoted to grand duke in June 1806. However, the monument to the dukes of Zähringen was not only for Karl Friedrich, who had the titles of grand duke of Baden and duke of Zähringen. It was also a symbol in commemoration of Berthold III of Zähringen (who founded Freiburg), Conrad I of Zähringen (who built the Münster), and Albert of Austria (who donated the Albert-Ludwigs-University of Freiburg).

All of this was expressed through Latin inscriptions on the pedestal of the fountain, which read:

- North Face:

CARLO FREDERICO MAGNO BADENSIUM DUCI, DUCUM ZARINGIAE PROLI, INTER IMPERANTES NESTORI, PRINCIPI OPTIMO GRATA CIVITAS FRIBURGENSIS MDCCCVII. "To Charles Frederick of the Grand Duchy of Baden, descendant of the line of the Dukes of Zähringen, the oldest of the best of dukes, Freiburg's grateful citizens dedicate this memorial in the year of 1807 A.D."

— Mayor and council of the Grand Duchy of Baden's capital Freiburg im Breisgau

- East Face:

EN BERTOLDUM III ZARINGIAE DUCUM QUI FRIBURGUM CONDIDIT LIBERAM CONSTITUIT, PRIMAM CISRHENAM SUIS LEGIBUS VIVERE JUSSIT MCXX. "Behold Berthold III, Duke of Zähringen, who founded Freiburg, made it a free city and endowed it with municipal laws – the first on this side of the Rhine – in 1120 A.D."

— Mayor and council of the Grand Duchy of Baden's capital Freiburg im Breisgau

- South Face:

CONRADUS ZARINGIAE DUX, BERTOLDI III FRATRER, BURGUNDIAE RECTOR HUIUS URBIS TEMPLUM TURRIMQUE, AETERNUM ZARINGICAE PIETATIS MONIMENTUM, CONDERE COEPIT MCXXIII. "Conrad, Duke of Zähringen, brother of Berthold III, regent of Burgund, commenced the erection of the temple and tower of our city – this eternal monument of his ancestry's piety – in 1123 A.D."

— Mayor and council of the Grand Duchy of Baden's capital Freiburg im Breisgau

- West Face:

BERTOLDI I PRONEPOS XXIV SCIENTIARUM ACADEMIAM AB ALBERTO AUSTRIACO MCCCCLVI FRIBURGI FUNDATAM FIRMAVIT LEGIBUS, REDITIBUS AUXIT MDCCCVI. "Berthold II's [sic] twenty-and-fourth great-grandson was sustainer and expander of the academy, which was founded by Albert, duke of Austria, in 1456, in 1806 A.D."

— Mayor and council of the Grand Duchy of Baden's capital Freiburg im Breisgau

The monument was designed by Ferdinand Weiß in accordance with the plans of the Freiburg municipal council, which were examined and modified by the Baden construction director Friedrich Weinbrenner. The fountain was built by the mason and stone carver Johann Georg Riescher (1759–1827), while the sculptor Franz Xaver Hauser executed the model, the inscriptions and the statue. The latter showed Berthold III of Zähringen, depicted as an armoured knight with a shield and a spear. The statue was east-facing, toward the neighbouring ancestral Zähringen castle. It was mounted on a pedestal, for which Rischer had to use (contractually) the large 10 1/2 foot unit long, and, 5 1/2 foot width and, 1 foot thick altar stone from the broken Dominican church.

The other stones originated from the stone mine of Mussbach, which today belongs to Freiamt. The costs added up to 3806 guilder. Riescher, who was working on the trough and the pillar, was supported by Hauser, who as a consequence was blamed for the delay of the completion of the statue. Vinzenz Hauser, a brother of Franz Xaver, was responsible for the gilding of the monument. Vinzenz Hauser (1759-1831), a brother of Franz Xaver, was responsible for gilding the monument.

In 1888, the former octagonal basin of the fountain was removed to ease the traffic flow. The sculptor Julius Seitz replaced the octagonal basin by attaching a basin to each side of the substructure, whose girders symbolise the four elements in stylized animal figures. Moreover, in 1904 the fountain was shifted 2,50 metre northwards in order to cope with the shift of rails for the electrical tram. The statement by the Freiburger Newspaper, that the Bertholdsbrunnen is still named Fischbrunnen by the vernacular is erroneous, since the Fischbrunnen was shifted as neighbour fountain northbound and continuously retained its name.

=== Replacement ===
The fountain of Zähringen was completely destroyed by bombers during a British airstrike on November 27, 1944. The offer by the sculptor Hugo Knittel to make a replica of the old figure for free was turned down by Joseph Schlippe, who was responsible for the reconstruction, as he wanted to construct a "timeless" fountain. Knittel's draft was based partly on prewar pictures made by the spouse of the company Annemarie Brenzinger.

In the end, the curatorship of Bertoldsbrunnen, which was founded in 1957, agreed on a design by Nikolaus Röslmeir (1901 – 1977). It provided for a relatively abstract monument: a pedestal made out of limestone, approximately 12 feet tall, which is positioned in a shallow water basin (fountain) and which carries an equestrian statue. The overall shape of the fountain with its sculpture is inspired by gothic pointed arches, which is supposed to establish a connection to the Freiburg Minster. The pedestal bears the inscription "For the Dukes of Zähringen, founders and men of Freiburg im Breisgau" (Den Herzögen von Zähringen, Gründern und Herren von Freiburg im Breisgau). The arms of the (Swiss) Zähringer cities were not incorporated in the pedestal, as this would have weakened the overall impression. An emblem from the Middle Ages served as a basis for the equestrian statue.

The fountain was financed with donations which had been collected after the city council had conmmisioned it in February 1958. Overall, it cost 120,000 Deutsche Mark. On November 15, 1965, Lord Mayor Eugen Keidel laid the foundation stone. On November 27, 1965, the anniversary of the bomb attack of 1944, the fountain was presented to the public. However, due to the abstract design of the knight cast in bronze, the people were not pleased with it.

In the year 1972, the Kaiser-Joseph-Straße was pedestrianized. Because of this, the fountain was moved from the tram station north of the crossroads to its present locating in its middle. At the same time, the fountain basin was taken off, and the monument was placed in a water basin embedded in the ground. In 1979, the fountain had to be moved from the tram junction point north of the intersection to its present-day location right in the middle of the intersection.

Due to road works carried out by Freiburg Verkehrs AG and Badenova, a municipal energy provider, to modernize the rails and the sewers in this area, the fountain was not accessible from June to October 2014. In addition, the lighting of the memorial was modernized: Bertold is now illuminated by four LED lights incorporated in the water basin of the fountain.

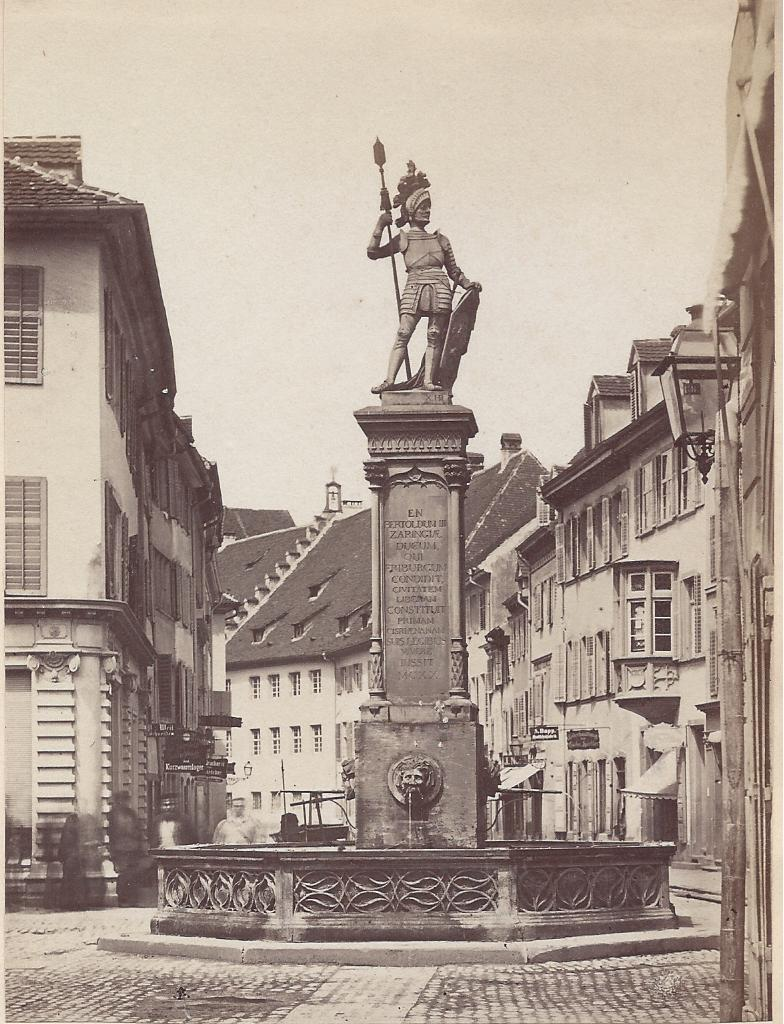
Bertoldsbrunnen 1860

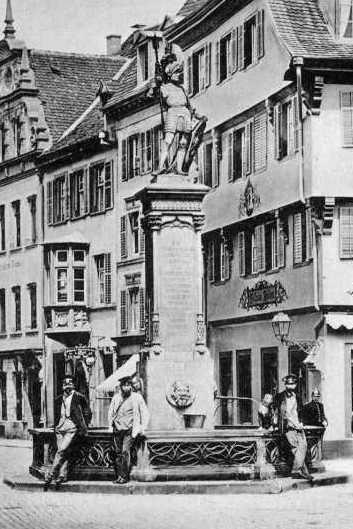
Bertoldsbrunnen 1880-2

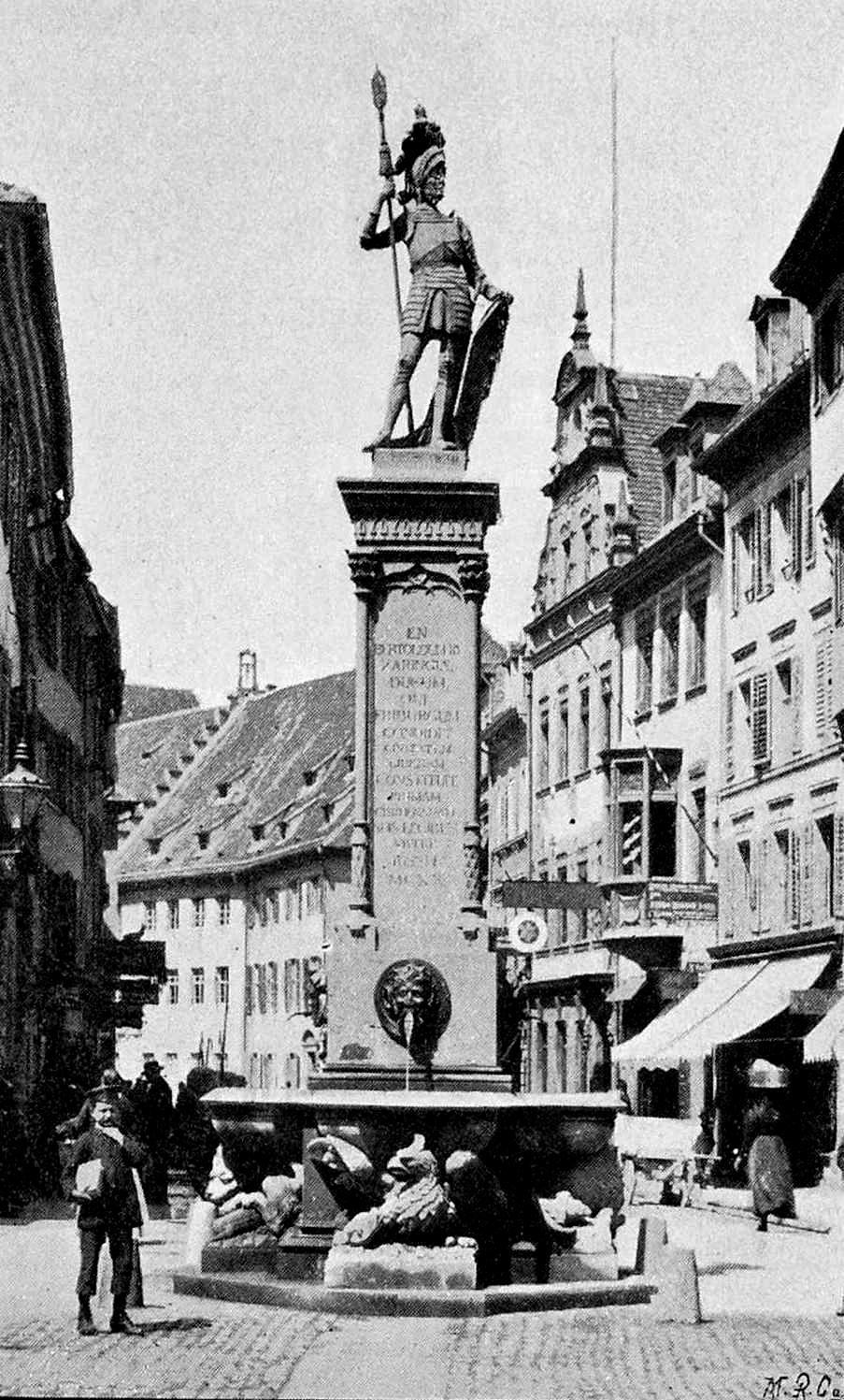
Bertoldsbrunnen 1888
