= Freiburg Bächle =

Runnels or formalized rills in Freiburg, Germany

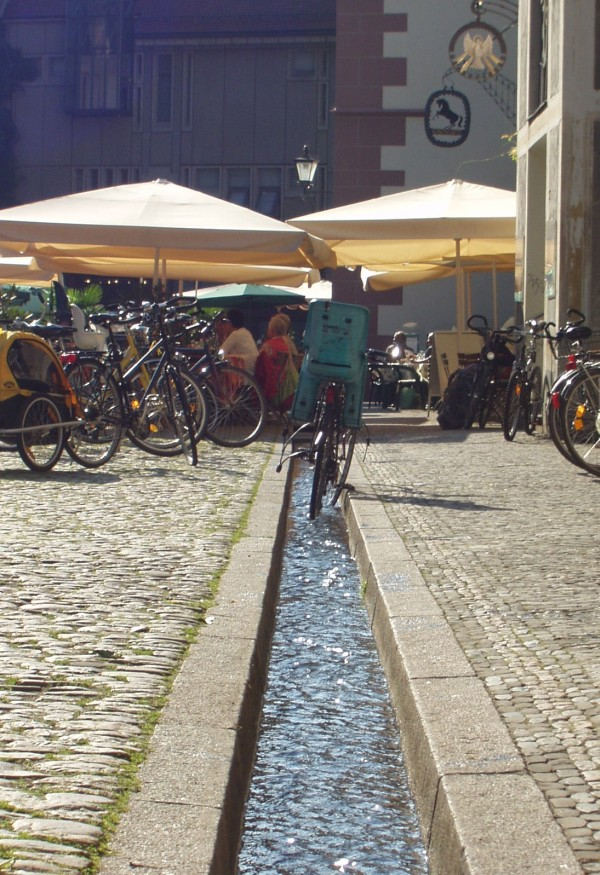
Bächle on central square

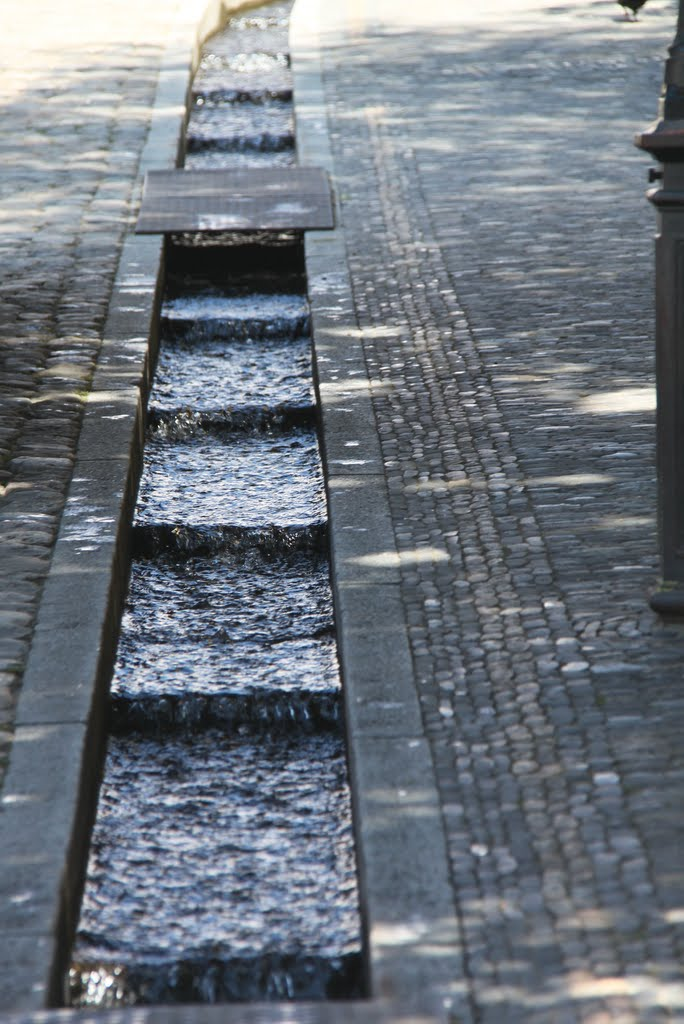
Freiburg Bächle

The Freiburg Bächle (German: Freiburger Bächle, pronounced [ˈfʁaɪbʊʁɡɐ ˈbɛçlə]) are small water-filled runnels or formalised rills in the Black Forest city of Freiburg. They are supplied with water by the Dreisam and can be seen along most streets and alleyways in the old city, being one of the city's most famous landmarks. The word Bächle comes from the German Bach, meaning brook, with the Alemannic diminutive ending -le; in standard German, it is Bächlein.

== History ==
First documented in the 13th century, the Bächle once served as a water supply and were used to help fight fires. In the 19th century they were seen as obsolete, and most of them were covered with iron plates. The Bächle were seen by many (among them the ADAC) as a traffic hazard due to their original location in the middle of the road, and as a consequence they were moved to the edge of the roads in 1852.

It is local superstition that if you accidentally step in the Bächle, you will marry a Freiburger.

The first documented mention of the Bächle dates back to the year 1220 when Count Egon I of Freiburg gave the Tennenbacherhof monastery permission to use a field which was irrigated by a Bächle. Another reference to the Bächle can be found in a document from the year 1238, according to which the Dominicans built a monastery adjoining the city wall inter duas ripas (Lat: between two (river)banks).

Several archaeologists deduce from the outcome of excavations that the Bächle had already been in existence in 1120 when Freiburg was founded, some one hundred years earlier than documented. The city of Freiburg was founded on the site of a previous settlement at the foot of the Schlossberg. The construction of artificial water courses, used to irrigate pastureland, was convenient because of the natural slope on which the settlement was built.

Around the year 1180 some street levels in the city were raised by up to three metres (10') with layers of gravel. Unlike in many other settlements this was not done to protect against floods since the riverbed of the Dreisam is significantly lower than the city. It is now believed that the entire system of Bächle was instead elevated in order to supply newer parts of the city with water. Thus, houses from the first half of the twelfth century are in line with a lower street level and all constructions after 1175 with a higher one. Those aggradations made the ground floor of a lot of houses impassable from the street, so that they were either raised or simply had front doors built at the level of their upper floors - which were then at street level. The amount of newly constructed buildings around 1175 thus surpassing the number expected by natural population growth, presumably also because the aggradations were used to substitute wooden constructions with stone ones.

The "Bächle" were part of the dual water supply system of Freiburg: The provision of the city with drinking water proved to be difficult, since the ground water is located 12 meters (40') under the ground and the few deeper wells could only last for emergencies. People directed mountain water from the bottom of the Bromberg in the east of Wiehre across Deicheln towards Freiburg and thus injected the urban running fountains. This system was sufficient for the supply of drinking water for the population, but it did not cover the demand of service water for animals outside of the city walls. Therefore, additional water was branched of the Dreisam and drained through the city's artificial waterstreams, called "Runze". Since for a long time the term "Runze" was used for both the Bächle and for canals, it is not possible to properly distinguish the two facilities in historical sources.

Ever since their existence the Bächle transported rainwater out of the town, carrying along all sorts of dirt. In order to be a positive sight at daytime, no „substances causing offence" („Ärgernis erregende Stoffe") were allowed to be disposed of at daytime. Council regulations from the 16th century then forbade the disposal of solid substance in the Bächle entirely:

"And nobody shall pour dung, straw, stone into the Bäch…" (Und soll nymandt dhein mist, strow, stain in die bäch schütten…)

— Town of Freiburg, Council regulation from 16th century.

After their way through the town, the Bächle were used to irrigate fields. The water was funneled to the fields across the moat by wooden bridges called „Kähner“. The „used“ Bächle water increased the value of the fields massively by being a very nutrient-rich fertiliser. The Bächle floated snow out of the town and hereby extended crop cycles in spring. In case of drought they secured the continuance of the harvest.

The Bächle originally ran down the middle of the road, which can only be seen today in the Market street. They were considered because of the massive increase in the population in the 19th century as an obstacle for the rise in traffic. Between 1840 and 1851 they were laid at the edge of the road, and the majority were covered with wood or iron plates or edged with stone chutes or pipes. It was recorded that the response was negative from some of the population:

"For several days they have been replacing brook, which until now ran through Grünwälderstraße, with cement tubes. The residents of this road are losing a beneficial amenity, which is so pleasing to the eye for visitors to Freiburg compared with other cities. In any case there must have been very weighty authoritative reasons, which justify such a change, without listening to the primary wishes of the residents of the street, regarding the Bächle. We feel that the expressed concerns can’t be shared, because those in powerful positions intend to conceal the canals. For the above-mentioned, change has been evoked by multiple unpopular statements from participating parties."

The Freiburg residents did not want to abandon the Bächle. New Bächle were even produced until 1858, for example, in the ‘Roß-’, ‘Engel-’, and ‘Kasernengasse’ (streets), and also the timber market place. For this task, according to the fire safety regulations of 1692, the townsfolk of Oberlinden had to appoint people of their group every year on 1 May who were supplied with studs by the city. For instance, in 1713, prior to the siege by the French army, 46 households were supplied by these. The fire regulations of 1838 again fortified the important role of the Bächle. It directly requested the fountain craftsmen to "instantly adjust the water in fountains and city streams according to the area of the blaze". Since this way, there was fire water available directly available at the location of the fire, it wasn't necessary to build up long bucket brigades to the next water standpost anymore.

The modernization of the drinking water and water network from 1850 and the production of fire hydrants in the late 19th century meant that the importance of the Bächle decreased as a source of water to fight fires. However, in the following century they helped to extinguish fires during the British raid on 27 November (Operation Tigerfish), in which parts of the town centre were totally destroyed. Witnesses reported that after the raid, the Bächle came in handy, because the industrial streams were buried and the water pipes destroyed, therefore deeming the hydrants useless. [21] Without the water from the Bächle, the area of Oberlinden, the historic department store, the Wentzinger house and other buildings wouldn't have been able to be saved.

By November 1945, mayor Wolfgang Hoffmann had already called for the courses of the stream to be cleaned in order to start using the Bächle again. Because of the cleaning work, the Bächle often couldn't flow properly, and at times, the Bächle themselves exacerbated the work. Due to these two factors it took until the beginning of the 1950s for the Bächle to be able to run again in the rebuilt city. In 1952, the FAC ("Freiburger Automobil-Club") demanded the removal of these "traffic obstacles". A visitor in 1956 proposed to attach references of the Bächle to the place-name signs. At roughly the same time a merchant filed a suit against the town of Freiburg after having driven into a Bächle in Salzstraße and consequently hitting the wall of a house. The lawsuit over the costs of 2360 DM was rejected. A similar thing happened 1964 to a tourist who sued the city after breaking a leg when he tumbled into the Bächle at Adelhauser Street. He was sentenced to pay a third of the damage himself. This was based upon the fact that the Bächle should have attracted his attention after a day in the city and that it should "so long as somehow possible keep holding on to such a characteristic, beautiful and hygienic quirk as presented by the Bächle". At least, in consequence of the accidents at the end of the 1960s, the city instituted that the bottom plates of the Bächle, among others the ones in the Salz- and Bertholdstreet, were put higher.

In 1973 the city centre of Freiburg was made a pedestrian zone with tram traffic. Since that time the Bächle didn't pose a significant traffic inconvenience anymore even though some of them actually run parallel to the tram tracks. The Bächle network between Rempartstraße and Martinstor was further enhanced and previously closed Bächle on Universitätstraße and Niemensstraße were reopened in 1986 following the Innenstadtkonzept 86 ("City Centre Concept 86"). Near the Neue Messe established in 2000 a Bächle was planned, but the idea nearly failed for financial reasons. Therefore, citizens and enterprises of Freiburg were appealed to sponsor: 500 DM for one meter (one yard) of that particular Bächle. Thus even two kilometres (1¼ miles) from the city centre there now is a Bächle. It is completely independent from the ones in the city centre, however.

The current version of the "Article for the cleaning of pavements" ("Gehwegreinigungssatzung") issued on 8 March 2007 by the city administration mentions the Bächle in several passages: In pedestrian and traffic-calmed zones pavements are defined as the lateral areas separated by Bächle or gutters. Bächle are to be kept free of snow and rubbish.

In the present day, the Bächle are important in modern-day Freiburg's civil life, with boat races being held for children to sail little painted boats, citizens using them to cool their feet on hot days, and also serving as a symbol of the city for tourists and other visitors.

== Infrastructure ==
Far above the old town, at the Kartause's grit channel, a watergate directs water from the Dreisam into the canal. Before being moved to its present-day location in 1852, this water conduit was located below the Sandfangbrücke. Up until the beginning of the 21st century, this watergate had to be operated manually. It was as recently as 2009 that an automatic inlet construction was put into operation. The canal fills a mining tunnel at the bottom of the Schlossberg. This roughly 400 meter (around 1130 feet) long tunnel was partly bricked and partly sculpted into rock. Memorial stones for master builders, master-workmans and mayors of Freiburg can be found there. A historic map implies that the canal was an open stream before the construction of the Vauban's stronghold from 1679 onward.

At the same level of the Schwabentor, the water volume is regulated by means of a watergate. That way, 200 to 500 liters per minute of water can flow into the Bächle's network. Thereby it is completely refilled every 8 minutes. Thanks to the difference in altitude between east and west of Freiburg's old town, the Bächle flow downwards in a north-west direction with a natural base slope of 1° to 2°. The main distribution happens in Oberlinden. It's also possible to branch off some water in order to water the alte Linde (old lime-tree) from the year 1729. After running through the city, the water flows back into the canals at Predigertor. It is redirected into the Dreisam at the Höllentalbahnbrücke and near Lehen. However, some of the canal's water is also flowing from the northern stream course through different streams into the Glotter. Back when the Bächle were still used for the watering of fields, it was also redirected at the Christoffeltor and the Mönchstor over the city walls.

The ‘Runzknecht’ ensures the distribution of water. 142 brass valves help the regulation, through which the water can also be turned off during the cleaning of the Bächle. Furthermore, there are plugholes on the bases of the Bächle, which connect the Bächle water systems with the central sewerage system into which the water drains. 15 overflow thresholds in the sewers or the industrial stream prevent basements being flooded with high levels of water.

The responsibility of keeping the streams clean rests on three full-time “Bächleputzer” (previously: “Bachräumer”) (bächle cleaners / Bach clearers) since at least 1789, who are employed by the city administration of Freiburg. Twice a day they clear the Bächle of rubbish and leaves which also get caught in the Bächle grills. Furthermore, the so-called “Bachabschlag” takes place annually in autumn and during a weekend in spring, when the water from all of the canals and Bächle is drained. The “Bachabschlag” is used not only for cleaning but also to check for damage and if necessary, repair. Further reasons for stopping the Bächle are for example: road works, the Freiburg wine festival and the Carnival/Fasching parade in which Hästräger, (those wearing a Carnival costume) from the “Bächleputzer” jester's guild (established in 1935) can be marveled at.

Accommodated to the width of each respective street, the Bächle themselves are each different sizes. The widest Bächle with a width of around 75 cm (2 ft 6 in) is located near the Schwabentor and the smallest one which is approximately 15 cm (5.9 in) wide runs through the narrow old city alleys. Over time the shape of the streams has changed:

At first the Bächle were flowing freely in shallow ditches at street level, but in the nineteenth century a sandstone frame was put in to control the flow of the Bächle. Since the construction in the 19th century the base of the Bächle was cemented and the lining was made up of granite tiles. Then in the 20th century it changed and remains the same to this day: the bases are paved with granite or Rhine gravel. The Rhine gravel is also used for paving, but is hard to come by. This requires a specially educated paver. The lining of the Bächle can also be made with Rhine gravel, porphyry or basalt.

Middle age

19th century

19th to 20th century

20th and 21st century

== Flora and fauna ==
The presence of microorganisms such as the larvae of some kinds of Mayflies, Caddisflies and Black Flies indicate the high water quality throughout the Bächle. In some years, Amphipodae can also be found in the Bächle. They are known to prevent the growth of algae.

== Quotes on the Bächle ==
"Venice for your feet"

— Klaus Eberhartinger 2010 at a concert

"On the longs walks through the traffic-free city center one crosses a channel carelessly - and suddenly a little boat made out of paper is floating by. Children are playing in the water in the middle of the business center of a city. [...] Fresh water from the Black Forest is briskly flowing next to the streets, taking with it the dust and cleaning the air. At least this is the argument when people from the north complain about the absurd and dangerous mantraps. Of course one wants to respond with something that gives an illusion of practical use. But I think, the Bächle are less for cleanliness than for the soul."

— Ruth Merten in Wenn Freiburgs Blüten blüh'n, 1986

According to a legend from the Baden region, anybody who accidentally steps into the Bächle on a visit to Freiburg will inevitably marry a Freiburg citizen. However, this has not come true yet for former chancellor Gerhard Schröder who stepped into the Bächle on his way to the town hall to the German-French summit in June 2001.

== Similar structures in different cities ==
Water streams in cities were more common in earlier days, but nowadays Freiburg is one of few cities left to still have them in form of the Bächle. At the beginning of the 16th century, Antonio de Beatis wrote about Innsbruck that the streets were "broad and had a lot of water channels and fountains". In Goslar the Gose was already rerouted through the city by 1200 and supplied the population with drinking water. For the sewage there were plastered gutters which could be flooded with fresh water in order to clean them or to help fight fires. Even older drainage ditches from the time between 1000 and 1100 were excavated in an Anglo-Saxon centre below Winchester in the 20th century.

In the late 13th century the Brausch in Strasbourg was led through the paved streets to remove sewage. Former town registrar Adolf Poinsignon supposed in the late 19th century that the little streams in the older towns in Alsace at the foot of the Vosges served as a model for the constructions. In the French town of Briançon, which has been reconstructed after a fire by Vauban, one can also find Bächle. A stream comparable to the Bächle in Freiburg is to be found in the centre of the wine-growing municipality Gumpoldskirchen in Lower Austria.

In Ollantaytambo, Peru, a similar system can still be seen today. This is one of the few remaining historic Inca towns where the original town layout has been preserved.
