= Siegesdenkmal =

Coordinates: 47.99791°N 7.85305°E

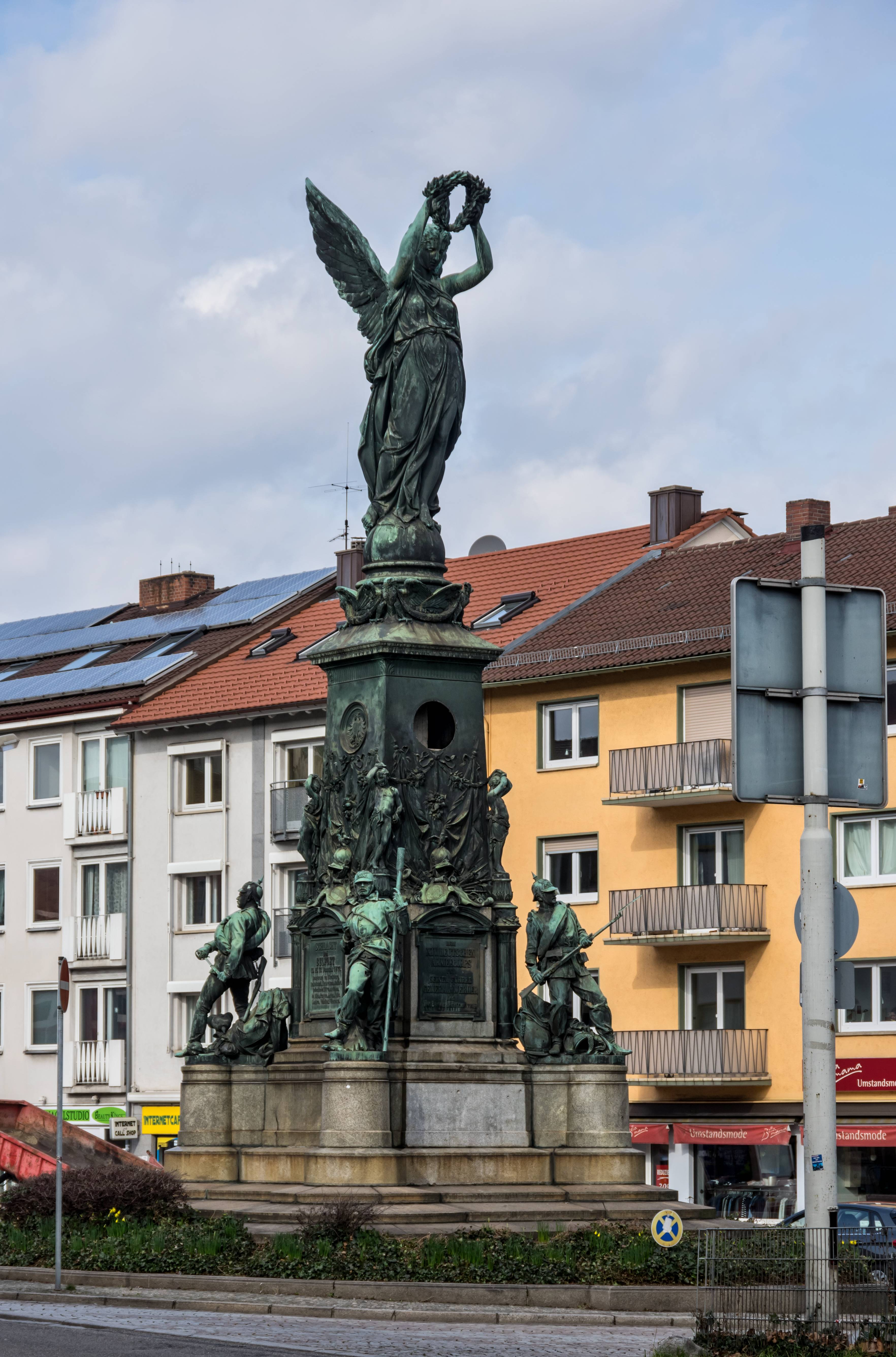
Siegesdenkmal (2009)

The Siegesdenkmal ("victory monument") in Freiburg im Breisgau is a monument to the German victory in the Franco-Prussian War in 1871. It was erected at the northern edge of the historic center of Freiburg im Breisgau next to the former Karlskaserne (barracks). After World War II it was moved 100m to the west. Today it is located on Europaplatz.

== History ==
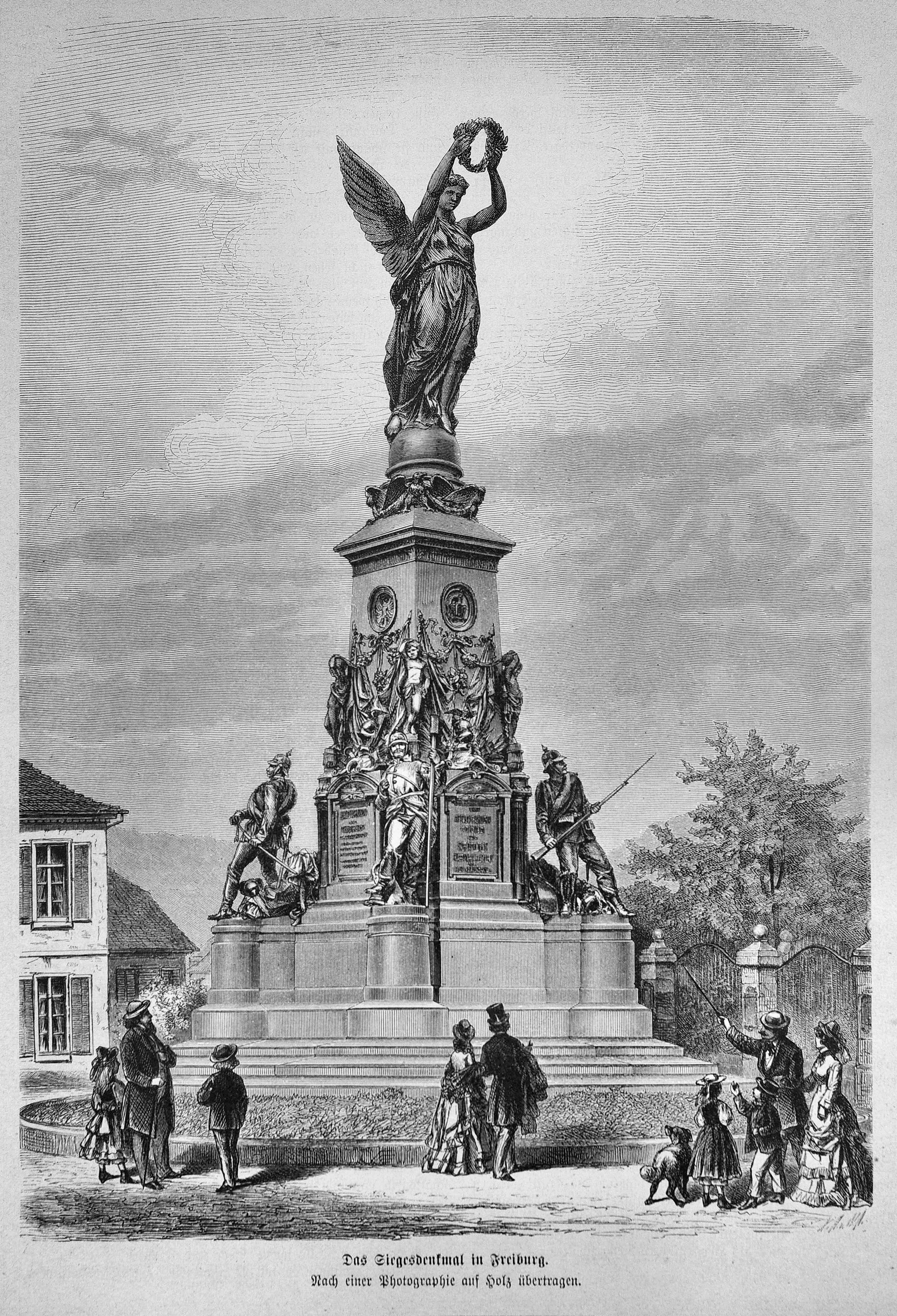
copperplate engraving from the magazine Die Gartenlaube von 1877

The Siegesdenkmal is dedicated to the XIV Corps (German Empire) of the German army, in which mostly soldiers from Baden served. Under the command of General August von Werder the battles at Montbéliard in 1871 ended in victory. In the general mood of victory, funds were raised in Baden (with cities from Lörrach to Karlsruhe participating), to erect a statue in the middle of Baden.

A public competition was organized among the sculptors in Germany for a design of the statue. Whereby, some artists were explicitly invited to participate. The jury consisted of five artists and art connoisseurs:

- Ernst Julius Hähnel from Dresden
- Wilhelm Lübke from Stuttgart
- Eduard Magnus from Berlin
- Friedrich Pecht a court painter from Munich
- Gottfried Semper from Vienna

The winner amongst the 18 competitors is Karl Friedrich Moest, a sculptor working at the art academy of Karlsruhe. He was then also in charge of the realization of the monument. Professor Caspar von Zumbusch from Munich and Reinhold Begas from Berlin earned second and third places respectively. Their models were displayed in the city's Augustiner Museum. Joint second place went to the sculptor Josef Alois Knittel from Freiburg im Breisgau, whose son Gustav Adolf Knittel later on became the master student of Moest and was involved in the construction of the Siegesdenkmal.

The sculptural and ornamental elements were made in the Bildgießerei ("casting house") of Lenz in Nürnberg and the work on the granite was conducted by local sculptor Alberto Luratti. For the decoration of the monument gun barrels from the defeated enemy were used. The total production cost amounted to 85,000 gold marks.

The monument was inaugurated on October, 3rd, 1876. At the inauguration Emperor Wilhelm I, Grand Duke Frederick I and his wife Louise, Imperial Chancellor Otto von Bismarck and August von Werder himself, among others, resided as guests of honor.

When the government was collecting metal in 1940, Robert Heinrich Wagner, the Gauleiter (district leader) on the Upper Rhine (Baden and Alsace), requested the monument to be given to Adolf Hitler as a birthday present. This request was denied by the city administration. In 1944, November, 4th, the monument survived a bombing even though the barracks of the Karlsbau, which are situated directly next to the monument, were entirely destroyed. The west wing of the building was rebuilt between 1950 and 1951. Nowadays, it houses the city's social welfare and youth welfare office.

In 1948, the request by the German Peace Society and Bund der Kriegsgegner (German Pacifist Union) to remove the monument was denied. In 1961, the monument was moved 100 m westwards as it had become an obstacle on the newly built city highway. There, the monument to the Baden Dragoons used to be situated, but this was removed after the war. At the old location of the Siegesdenkmal, a big crossroads was built, with tram and bus stations and a pedestrian underpass. In the course of the construction work on the Rotteckring, which started in 2014 and are anticipated to last to 2018, it is planned to move the monument back to its original place.

== Design ==
The memorial has a square base which is surrounded by steps on all four sides. It is made of granite from the Black Forest. The statue of the goddess of victory stands on the tapered pedestal. She is on a hemisphere and holding a laurel wreath. Four warriors armed with different types of weapons rise from the corners of the base. Three of them are intended to symbolize the defenders, but the fourth warrior, an artillerist, is fatally injured. The figures are considered the main work of Karl Friedrich Moest.

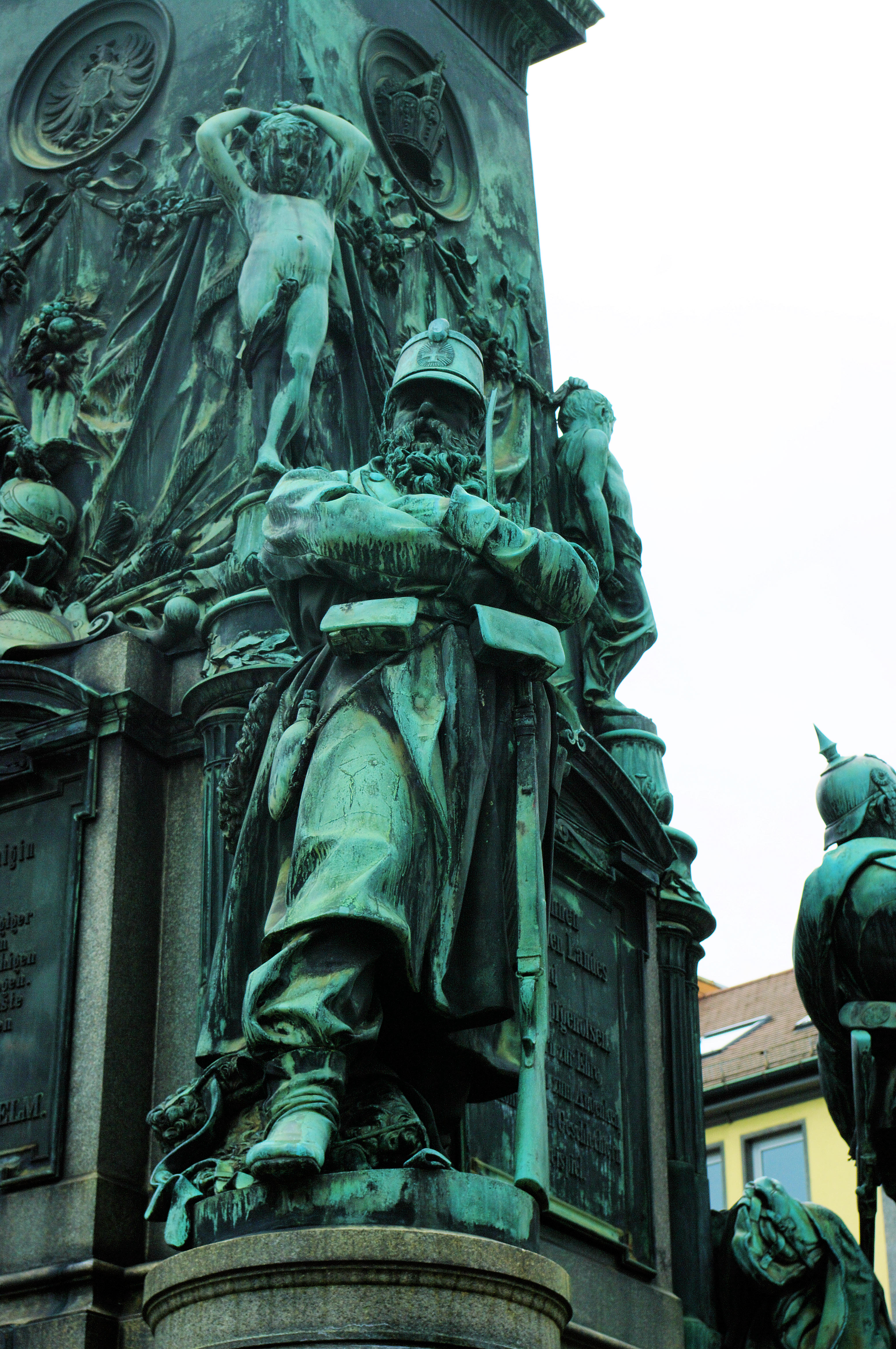
Statue 1

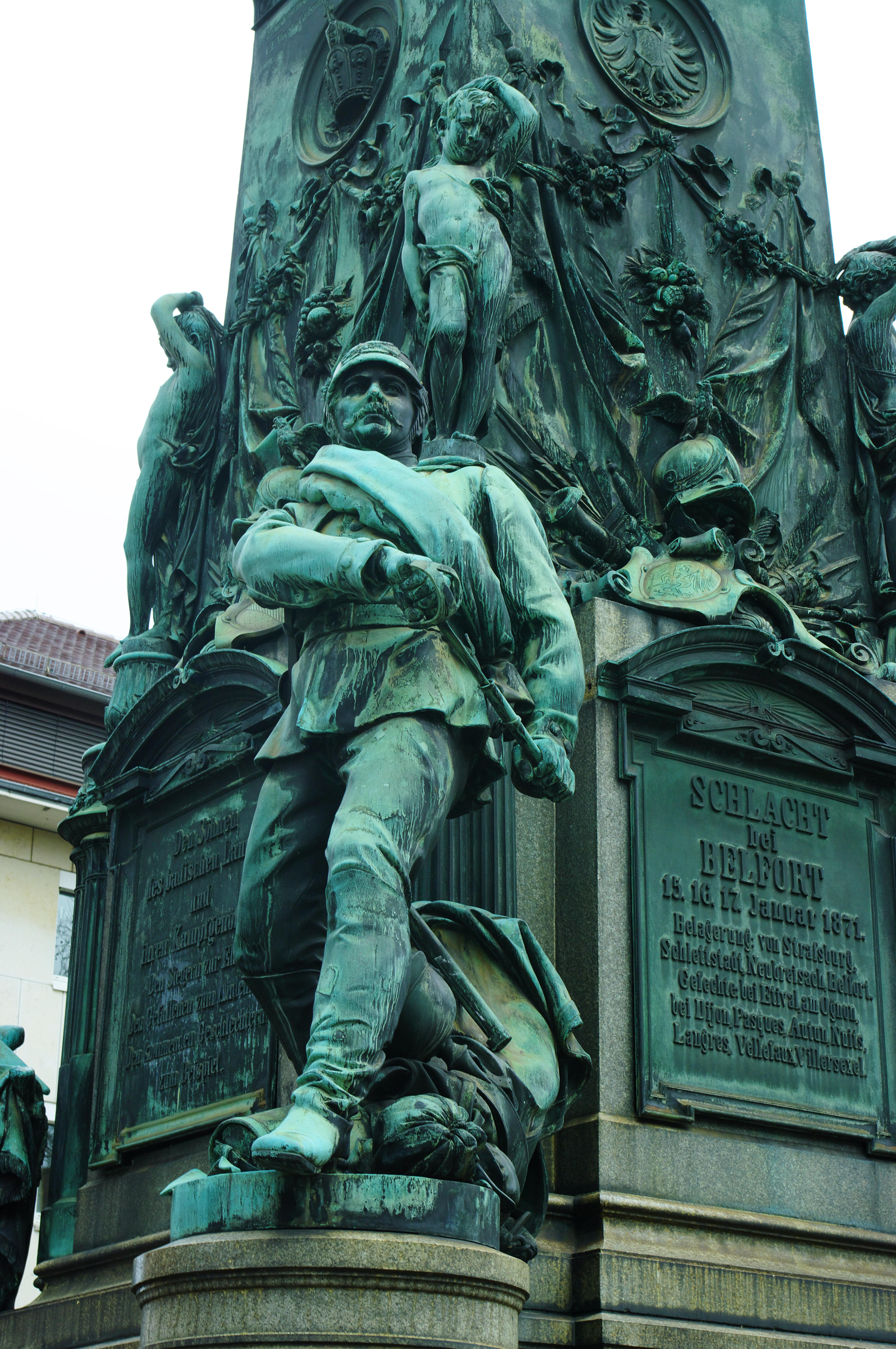
Statue 2

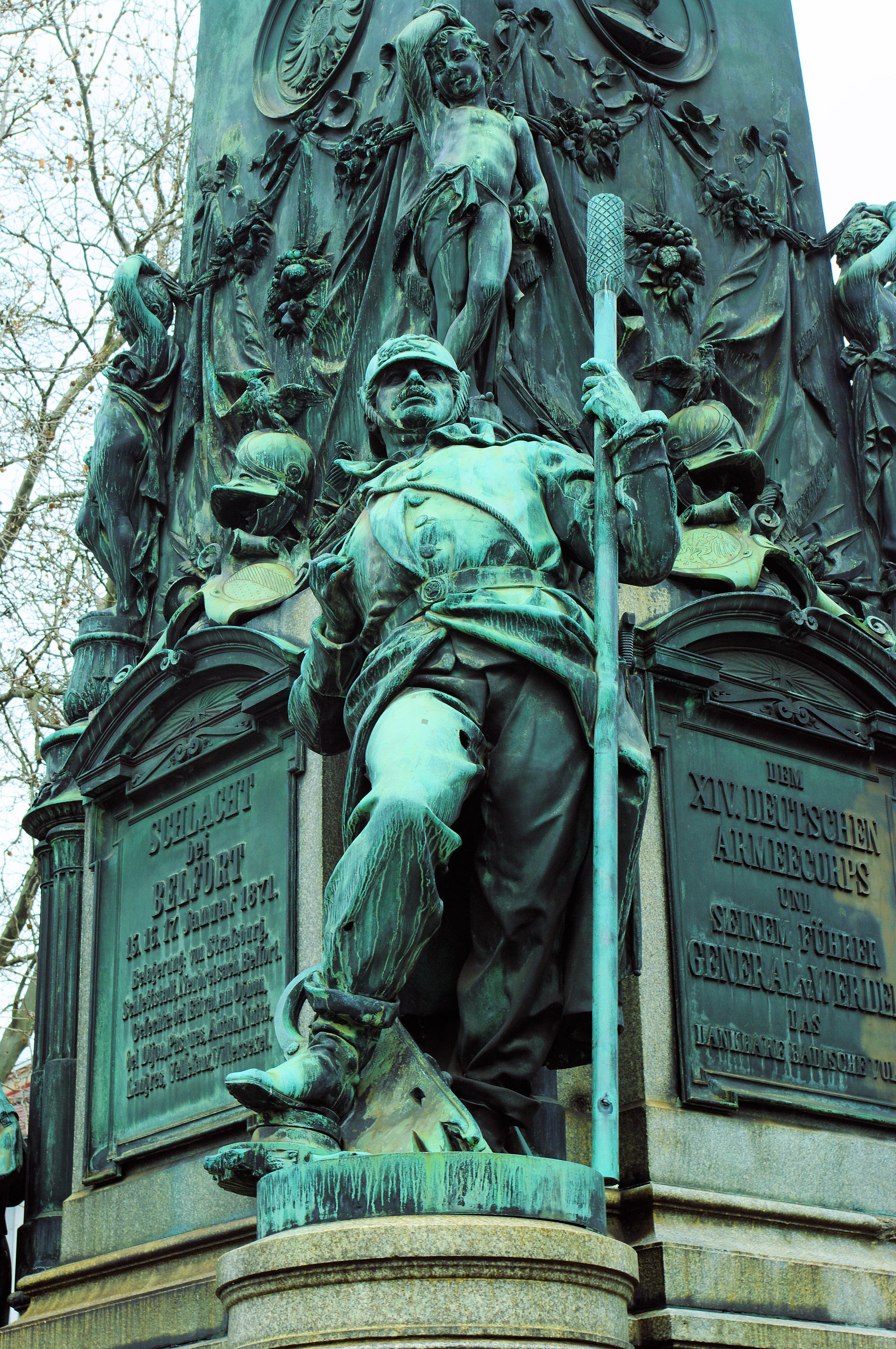
Statue 3

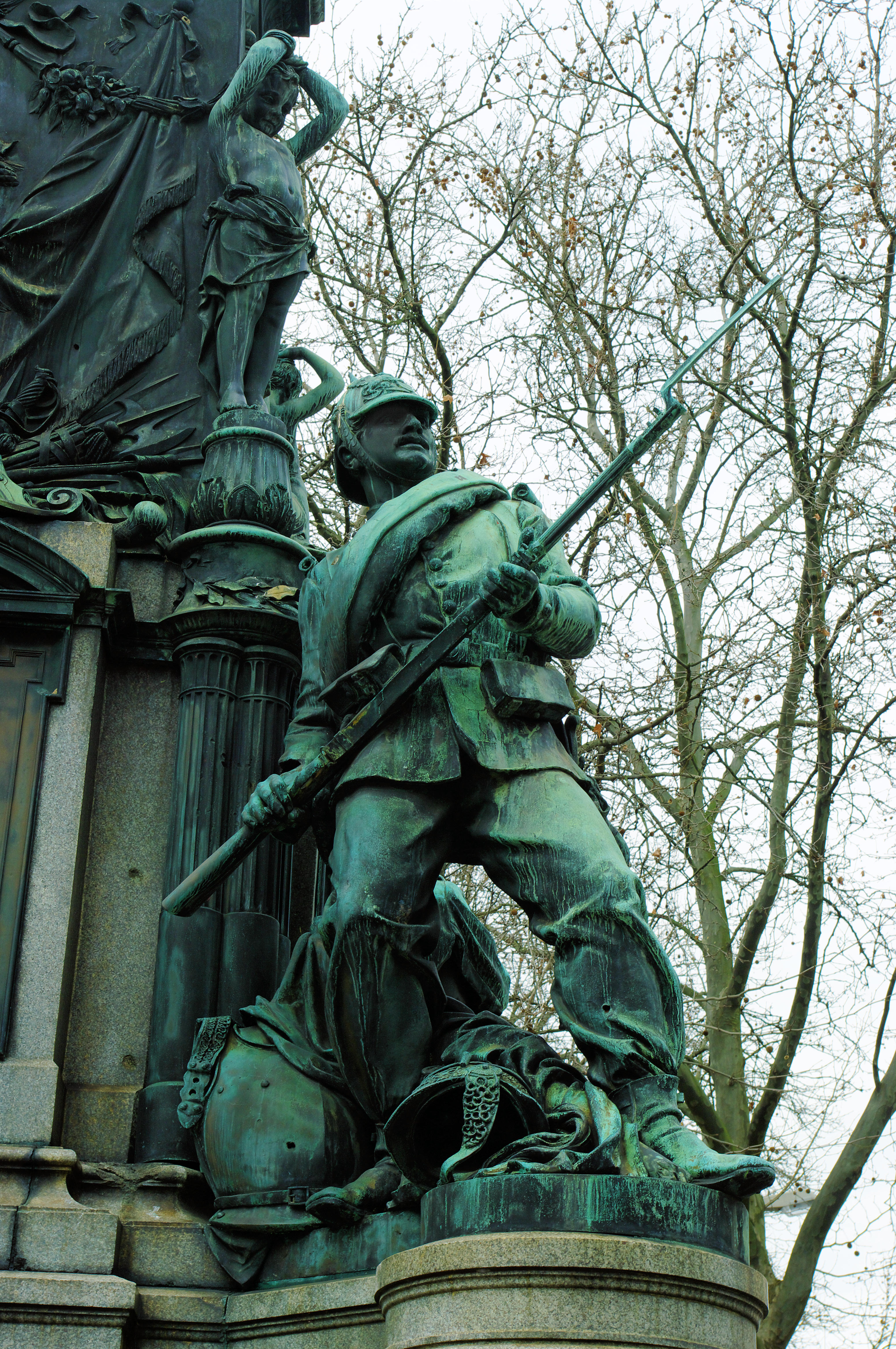
Statue 4

The pedestal shows four bronze tablets with inscriptions. Its corners are embellished with juvenile genii in positions of movement.

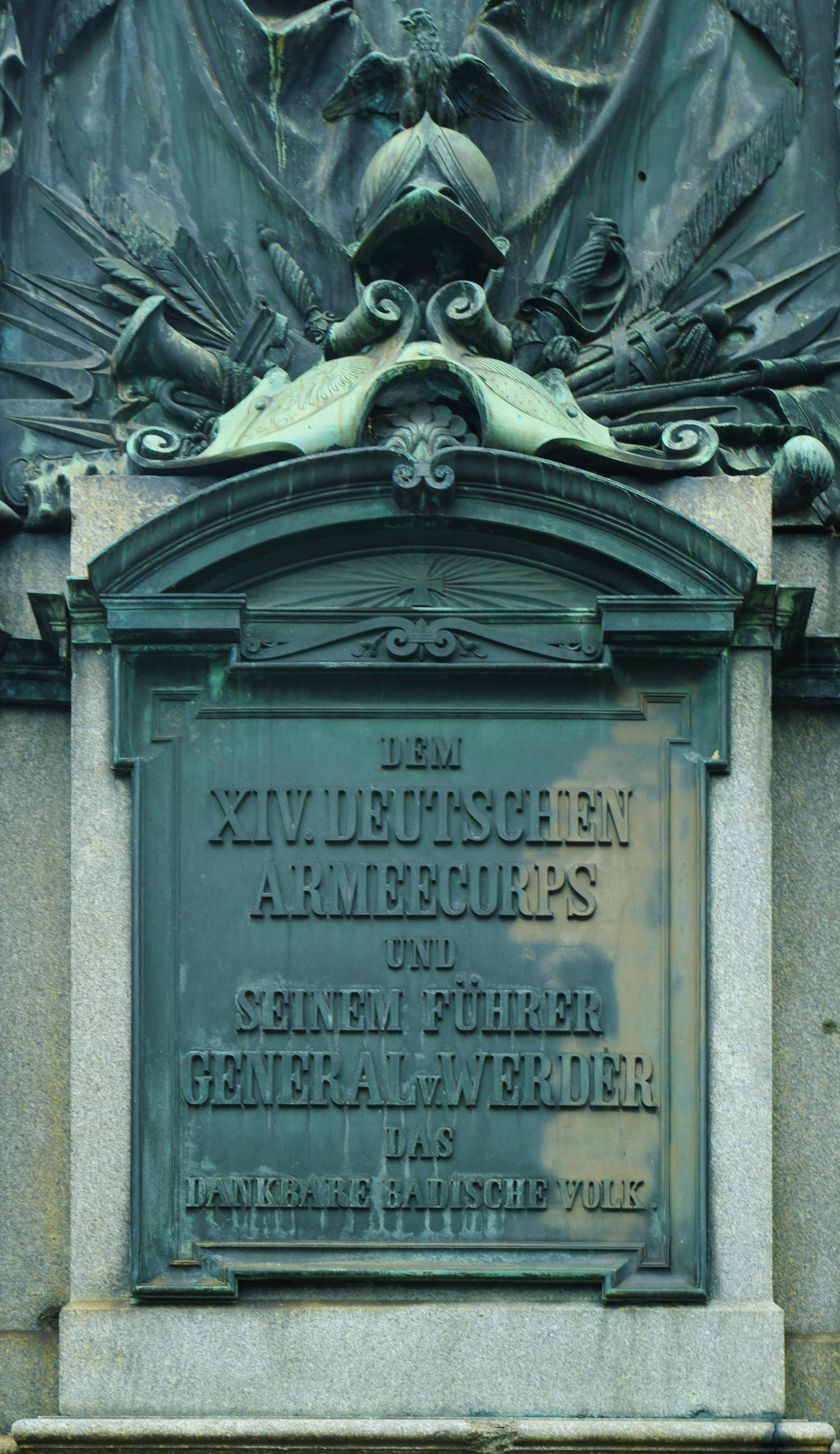
To the XIV Corps of the German army and its commanding General Werder – the grateful people of Baden

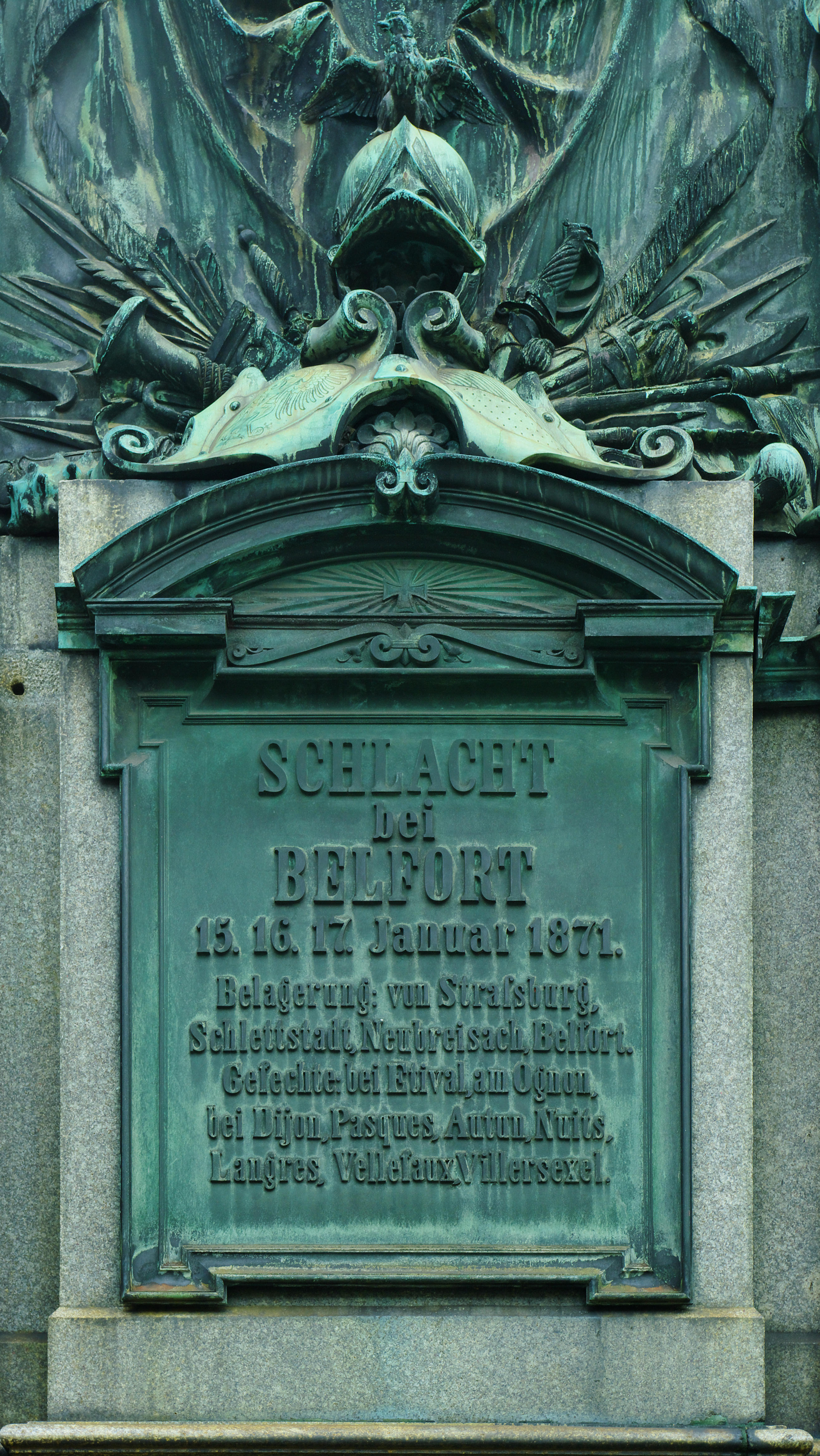
Battle at BELFORT 15. 16. 17. January, 1871. siege of Straßburg, Schlettstatt, Neubreisach, Belfort. Combats at Etival, at Ognon, bat Dijon, Pasques, Autun, Nuts, Langres, Vellefaux, Villersexel.

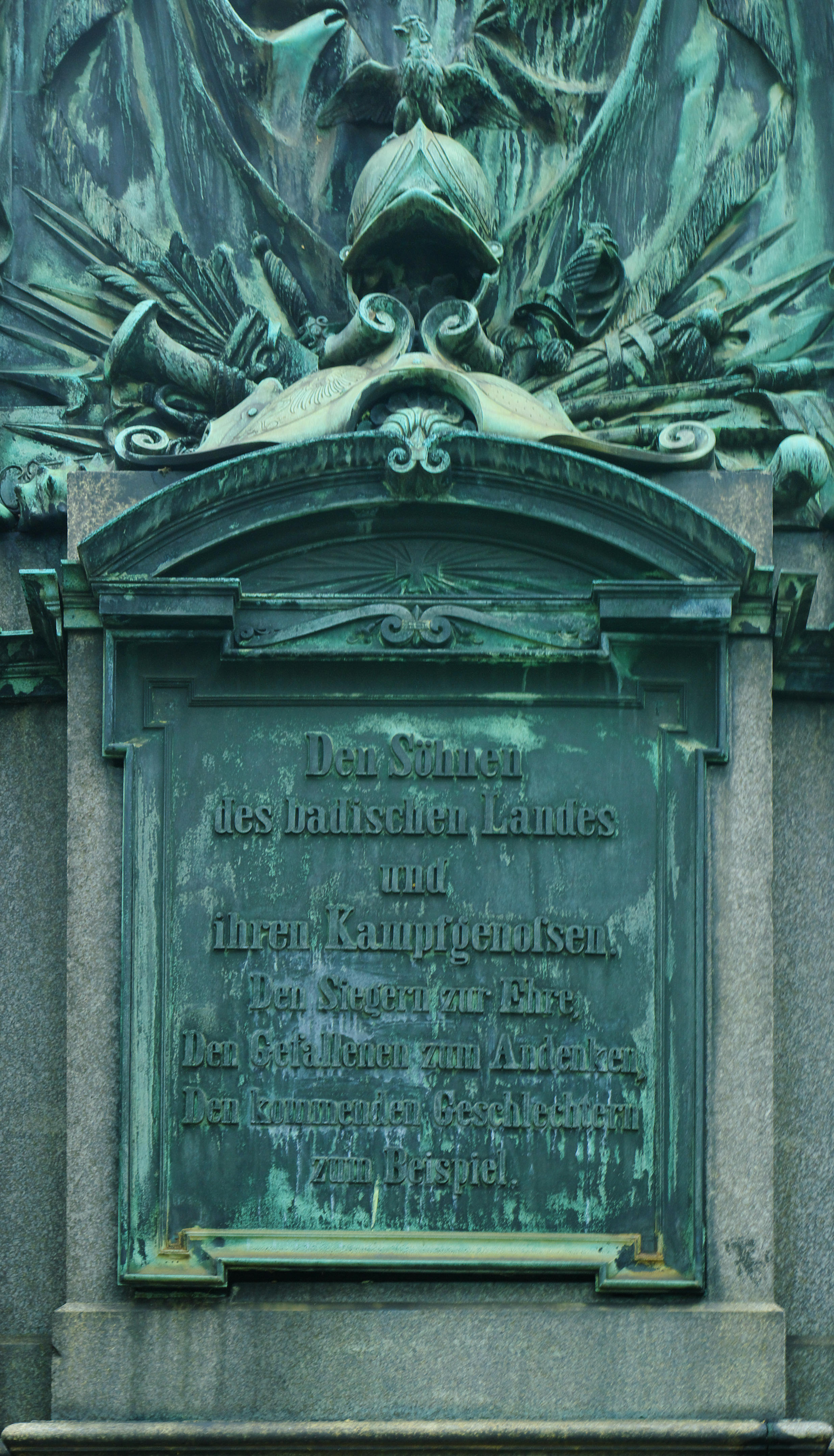
To the sons of Baden and their comrade-in-arms. To honor the victors, to remember the fallen, as a warming to future generations.

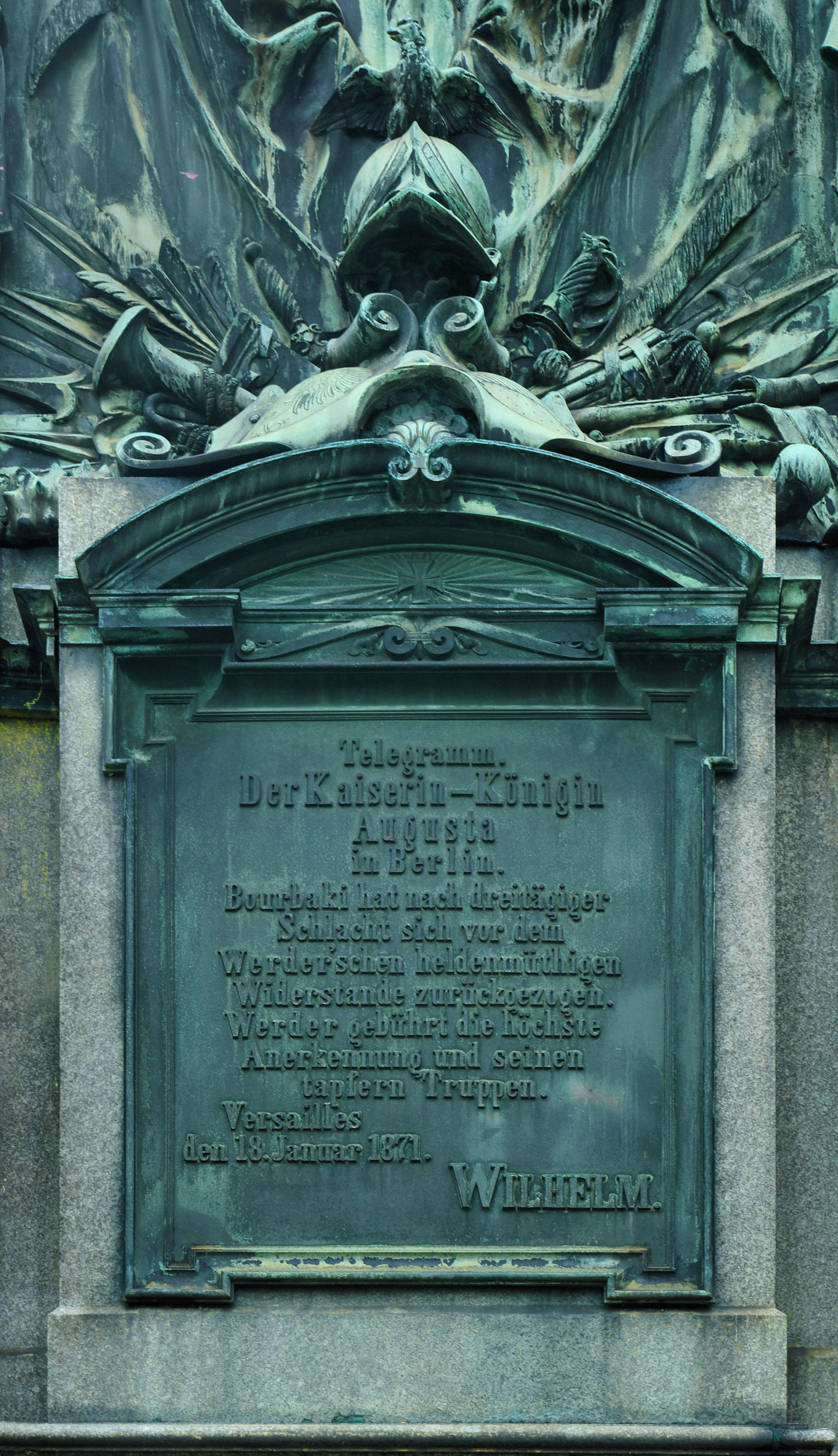
Telegramm of empress Auguste from Berlin. Bourbaki has withdrawn from Weder's heroic resistance after three days in battle. Werder and his courageous troops are worth our highest recognition. Versailles, 18th Januar, 1871 Wilhelm.

Above them, medallions with the emblems of the German Reich are engraved.

== Reception ==
A masterful result which dominates the location. Even if its architecture appears slightly too soft and too bluntly structured.

— Association of architects and engineers of Baden

With the defensive posture of the four warriors in the four corners of the base body, the artist thoughtfully depicts the main aspect of that glorious battle, where the challenge was not to attack, as the opponents did, but to defend the open door of the unprotected fatherland to the last man. Thus, three German men are now honored with memorials in Freiburg: Rotteck, Bertold Schwarz and Werder.

— Adolf Kröner in the Gartenlaube (a German newspaper)
