= Martinstor =

Ancient building in Freiburg im Breisgau, Germany

- Norsinger Tor (formerly)
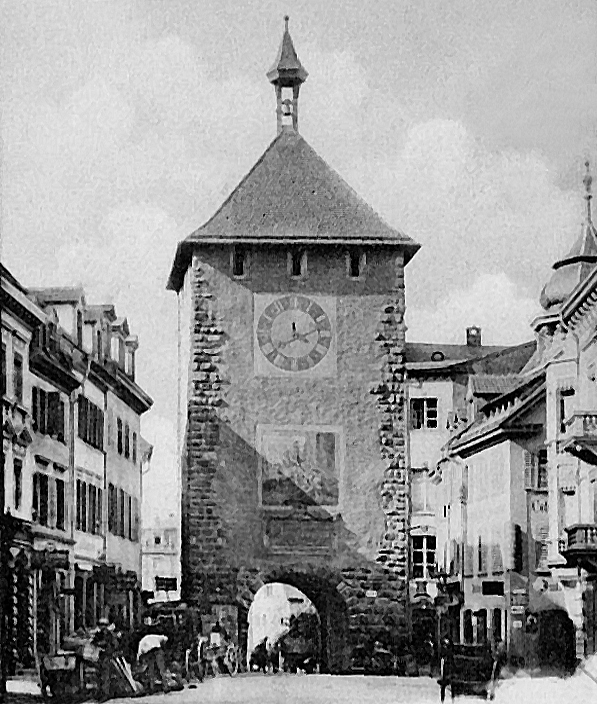
- The Martinstor before its Neo-Gothic reconstruction

- Location within Baden-Württemberg
- 47.993712°N 7.848921°E
- Type: Fortification
- Location: Freiburg im Breisgau, Germany

History
- Built: 13th century
- Original use: Urban defence

Site notes
- Height: 60 metres (200 ft)
- Architectural style: Neo-Gothic

The Martinstor (English Martin's Gate), a former town fortification on Kaiser-Joseph-Straße, is the older of the two gates of Freiburg im Breisgau, Germany, that have been preserved since medieval times. Both gates, the Martinstor and the Schwabentor, are located in the city centre. In medieval times the Martinstor was also known as Norsinger Tor.

== History ==
According to dendrochronological research the wooden beams date back to the year 1202; the gate was first given documentary evidence in 1238 as "Porta Sancti Martini" (Latin Gate of the Holy Martin). Over the centuries it has been reconstructed several times. At one time, it also served as a prison and it was said of its occupants that they had donned "The Cloak of Martin".

From the 17th century on the side of the gate facing the city was decorated with a picture of Martin of Tours. During this time, due to the construction and leveling of the suburbs by Sébastien Le Prestre de Vauban, the gate's link to the city was lost. Thus, Salzstraße served as the main access road from Höllental. There have been numerous restorations of the picture, the most recent of which was in 1851 by Wilhelm Dürr. In 1968/69 the picture was removed. To date the local town council has still not been able to decide on a new image. As a result there remains a blank spot in honour of the conflicts between the Freiburg Civil Defence and the French Revolutionary Forces.

The Martinstor underwent its biggest change in 1901. By this point, the surrounding buildings surmounted the old city gate and the old passageway had become too small for the growing city and the new tram infrastructure. Having momentarily considered demolition, the city council opted instead to modify the building. Under the direction of Carl Schäfer the tower was heightened from 22 to 60 metres and a new roof construction in the architectural style of the 15th century was added. An additional gate with a larger thoroughfare, designed in the same architectural style, was erected next to the original gate. A German Reichsadler was painted on the outer facade of the gate above the emblems of Freiburg and of the nearby region of Baden, before it was removed in 1951. A replication of a baroque sandstone plate depicting the Double-headed eagle of the Holy Roman Empire was later installed.

== Present ==
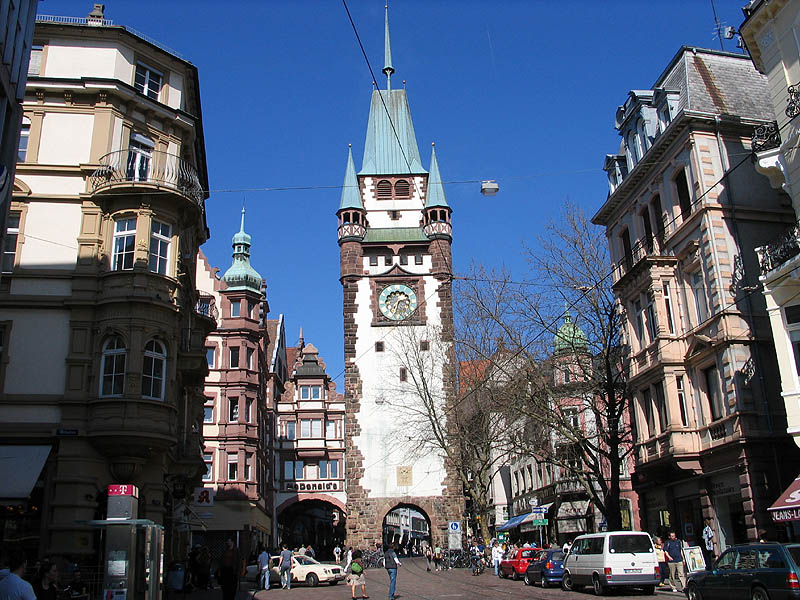
Modern view of the tower

Next to the archway, facing the city center, there is a tablet commemorating the burning of witches in Freiburg on which three names are engraved: Marghareta Mößmer, Catharina Stadelmann and Anna Wolffart. These women, all citizens of Freiburg, were executed in 1599.

Inside the western part of the arch, which was built in 1901, is the entrance to a McDonald's. The city council of Freiburg could not keep the company from putting up their sign, located above the archway, but could prevent the prominent red and yellow of the same in favour of a more neutral design.

The Freiburger Markthalle, the Theater am Martinstor (TAM) and the Martinsbräu are all located in the Martinsgässle, a side street near the arch.
