= Salzstraße (Freiburg) =

Coordinates: 47.9943°N 7.8518°E

The Salzstraße (German pronunciation: [ˈzaltsˌʃtʁaːsə], lit. 'Salt Road') is a significant part of the Freiburg city centre pedestrian area. It runs from Bertoldsbrunnen to Kaiser-Joseph-Straße, then eastward to Oberlinden square, where a fountain of the same name is located. It is probably the location of Freiburg's oldest houses. A stream, the Freiburg Bächle, runs along the street's northern side between the tramway tracks and the pavement.

== History ==
The name of this once important main street dates back to the time of the Zähringer family, when the salthouse was located on this street. Salt was transported here on carts from Swabia and sold at the salthouse. It was later moved into the merchants' hall on Schusterstraße, which was later expanded toward Minster square (Münsterplatz) and is now known as the Historical Merchants' Hall. The town's salthouse was relocated to the building next door at the Münsterplatz — the Redoutenhaus.

Traffic from Swabia and the eastern cities of Zähringen passed through the Black Forest and the Höllental to enter the city of Freiburg across Schwabentorbrücke and through the Swabian Gate. The transport connection via Freiburg was one of the most important east–west connections in Breisgau. Before the foundation of the city, this trade route ran eastward from Umkirch along the River Dreisam. Originally, the salt road was called Salt Alley.

The most important city family's town apartments were located along this route. These included, among others: the von Ampringen, Brechter, von Falkenstein, von Keppenbach, von Krotzingen, Küchlin von Küchlinsbergen and von Küchlingsburg, Meinwart von Tottikoven, Seulin im Hof, Seulin zur oberun lindun and Sneulin von Bollschweil, Wiesneck and Landeck. These families were representatives on the local council. From the mid-15th century on, new families advanced to this status and occupied the houses along the street, including, for example. the Fürstabt von St. Blasien, the Blumegg family and Freiherr Ferdinand Sebastian von Sickingen-Hohenberg. In 1769–1772, the latter erected the Sickinger Palace, which later became the Grand-Ducal Palace of the ruler of Baden.

In 1770, the Salzstraße was briefly renamed Dauphinenstraße, when Marie Antoinette, the youngest daughter of Empress Maria Theresa and Emperor Francis I of Austria, were staying in town during her bridal procession to the Royal Household of France. She was on her way to her wedding with Prince Louis-Auguste, the Dauphin. Before she continued her journey to Schuttern Abbey on May 6, Marie Antoinette stayed in the Kageneck house for two nights. The building is located at the corner of Salzstraße and Drehergasse.

Oberlinden square features a well and a lime tree planted in 1729. A mosaic made of paving stone is still proof of this. As the tree is now diseased, it has to be felled and replaced. This will be carried out once the tram line refurbishment is complete.

== Buildings ==
The Augustiner Museum, which was the former monastery of the Order of Saint Augustine, is situated on Salzstraße. The city archives are located at Salzstraße 18 in a building that dates back to the 16th century and was built by councillor Hans Graf. Its original name was Zum weißen Kreuz (The White Cross), until it was renamed Zum Herzog (The Duke) in 1565, referring to the statue in front of its portal. The building is located on the foundations of what is likely the oldest building in Freiburg (1120). The entrance to the city archives is located on Grünwälderstraße.

Before the city center was destroyed by bombing in November 1944, the guest house Großer Meyerhof extended from Grünwälderstraße to Salzstraße. It was built by the Riegeler brewer Wilhelm Meyer in 1885. After the building's destruction, the owner united several buildings in need of reconstruction into one.

The district court of Freiburg is located in the Sickingen Palace on the northern side of the street. It was built in 1769–1773 in a classical style by architect Pierre Michel d´Ixnard. It burned down in 1944, but was reconstructed between 1962 and 1965. The front was reconstructed to resemble the original, while the interior was redesigned for its contemporary use as a courthouse. Another historical building is located opposite Sickingen Palace: The former Commandry of the Teutonic Order is used today by the Department of Justice, housing civil divisions of the Higher Regional Court of Karlsruhe, and the chambers of the District Court of Freiburg. This Baroque-style building was designed by Franz Anton Bagnato, who worked mainly for the Teutonic Order (Deutscher Orden), and erected between 1768 and 1773. It also burned down in 1944 and was rebuilt between 1982 and 1986, with only the facade being reconstructed using original stones where possible. Both buildings, which were built at the same time in different styles, harmonise with each other.

The Kagenecksche Haus zum wilden Mann is located at the corner of Drehergasse and was first mentioned around 1460. It was owned by Schnewlin von Landeck during the 16th century, but later came into the hands of the Mayer family, when it became a tavern. It was purchased by J.H. von Kageneck, president of the Court Chamber of Austria, destroyed in 1944, and rebuilt in 1952 in a historicised design. The roof of the house at Salzstraße 51 features a gable with a small belfry that belonged to the former Antoniterhaus. The Antoniter brotherhood had been nursing people at this location since 1347. Around 1635, the site was abandoned and changed to a Pfründehaus (prebendary house). The church was desanctified in 1790.

At Oberlinden square, located between Salzstraße and Schwabentor, lies the house Zum roten Bären, which is one of the oldest taverns in Germany. The Freiburger Verkehrs AG service centre is located opposite the tram stop on line 1 towards Littenweiler.
