= Konrad Stürtzel =

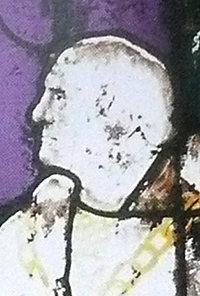
Konrad Stürzel, detail of the stained-glass window in the Freiburg Minster (original 1528)

Konrad Stürtzel von Buchheim (Stürzel, Stirtzel, Sturtzl, Sterczel) (about 1435 – March 2, 1509) was a German jurist for canon laws (Dr. jur. can.), knight and chancellor of the Holy Roman Emperor Maximilian I.

Konrad was born about 1435 as a son of a citizen in Kitzingen in Lower Franconia. In 1453 he went to the university in Heidelberg and left as a Master of Arts four years later. In 1460 he was one of the first professors at the young University of Freiburg in Breisgau, which belonged to Austria at that time and became its president for the first time in 1469. At the same time he studied canon law and got his doctor's degree (Dr. jur. can.). In 1478/1479 he again became president of the University of Freiburg.

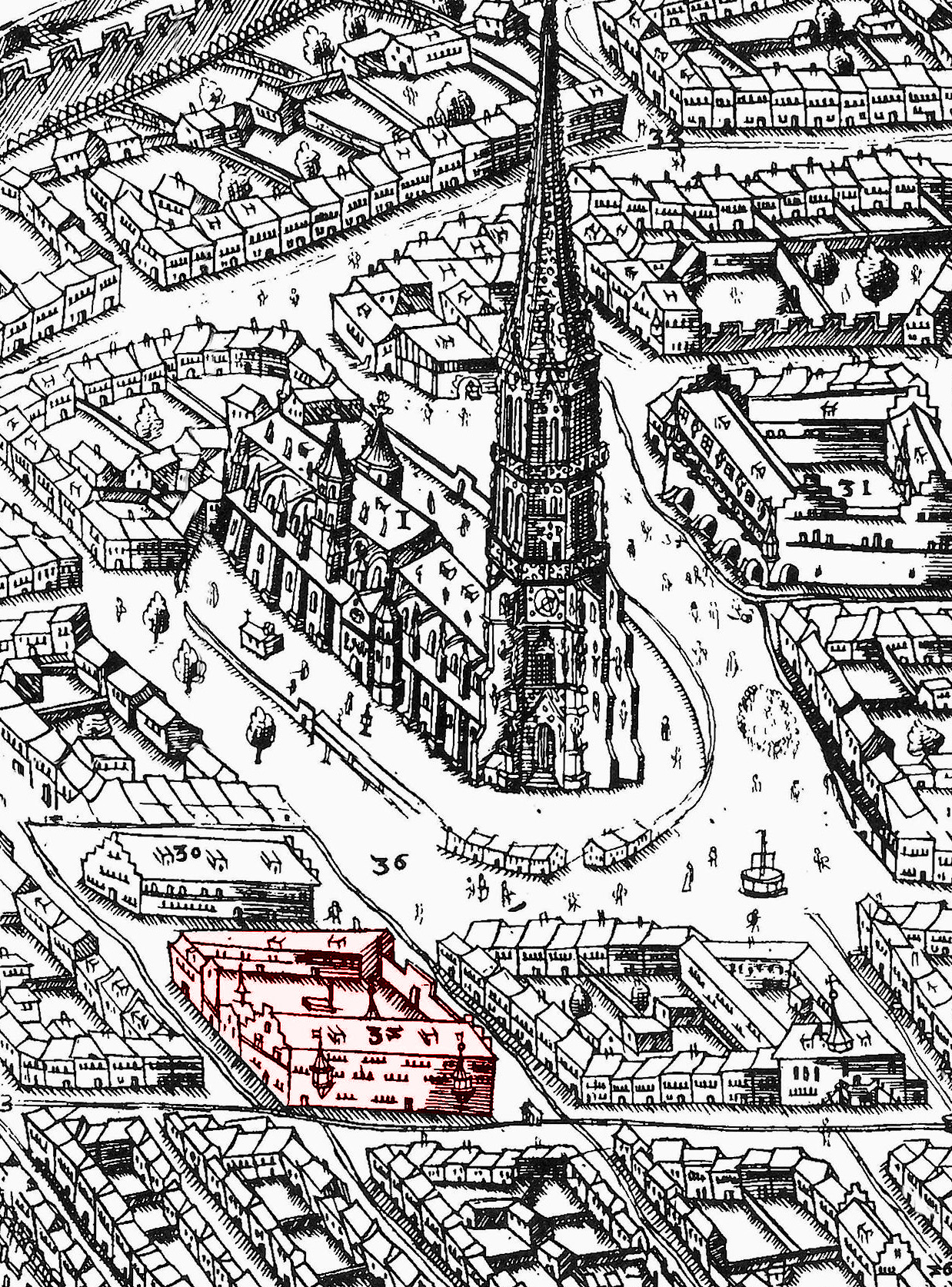
Stürtzels residence in Freiburg 1589 (later called 'Basler Hof')

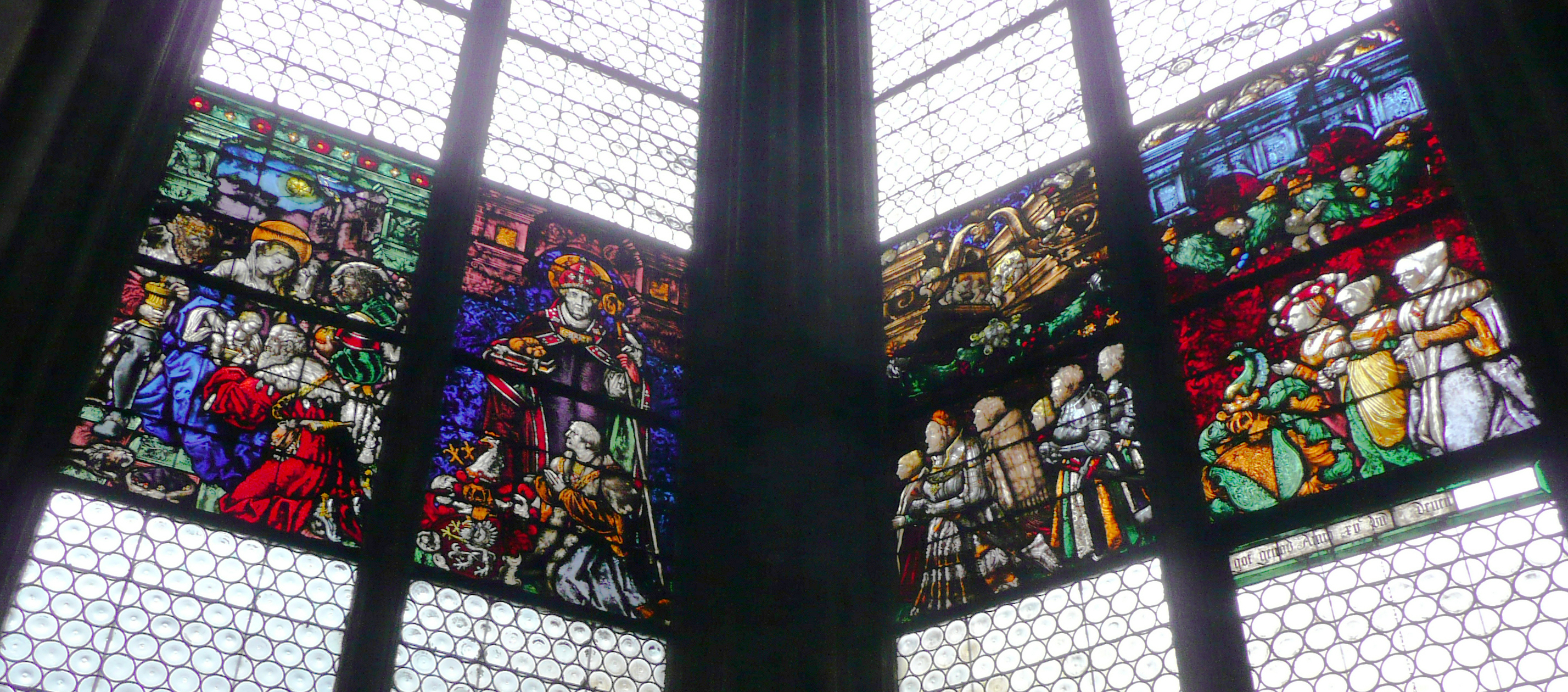
Stained-glass windows in the Stürtzel-chapel in the Minster (modern copy)

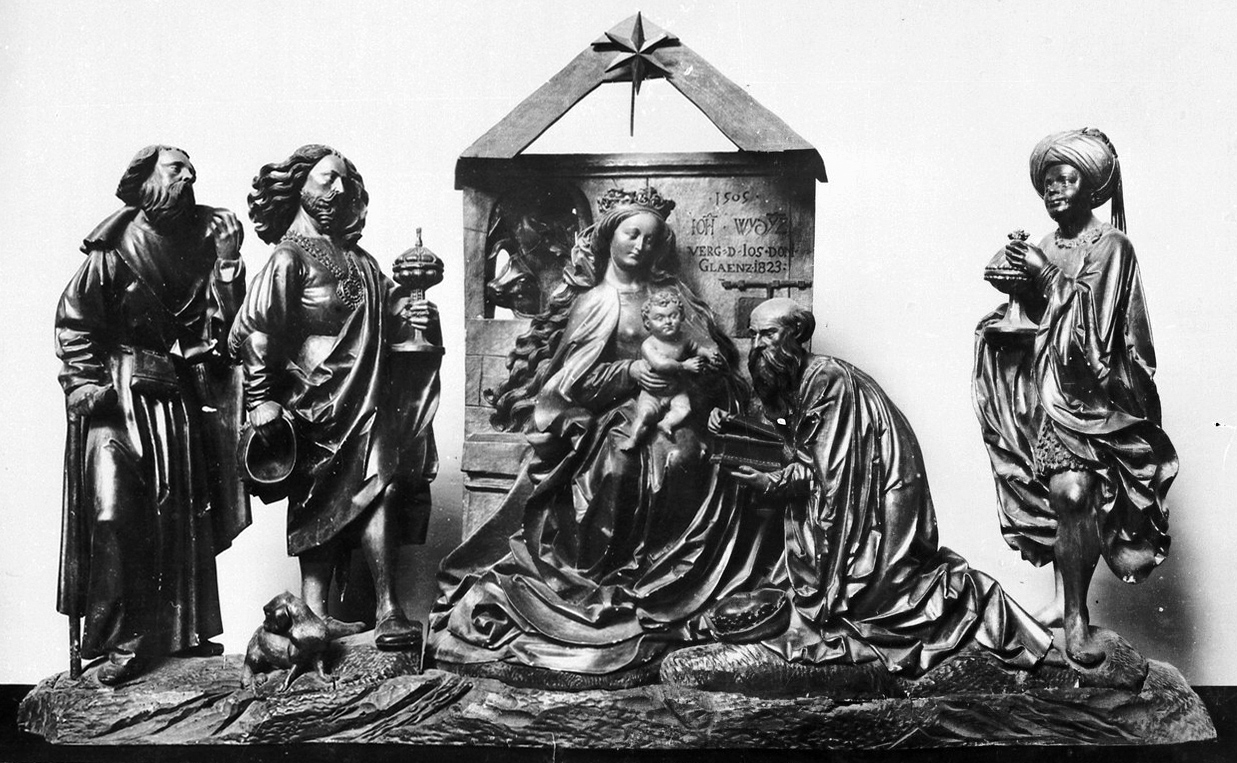
Figures of Stürtzel's Three-king-altar (1505)

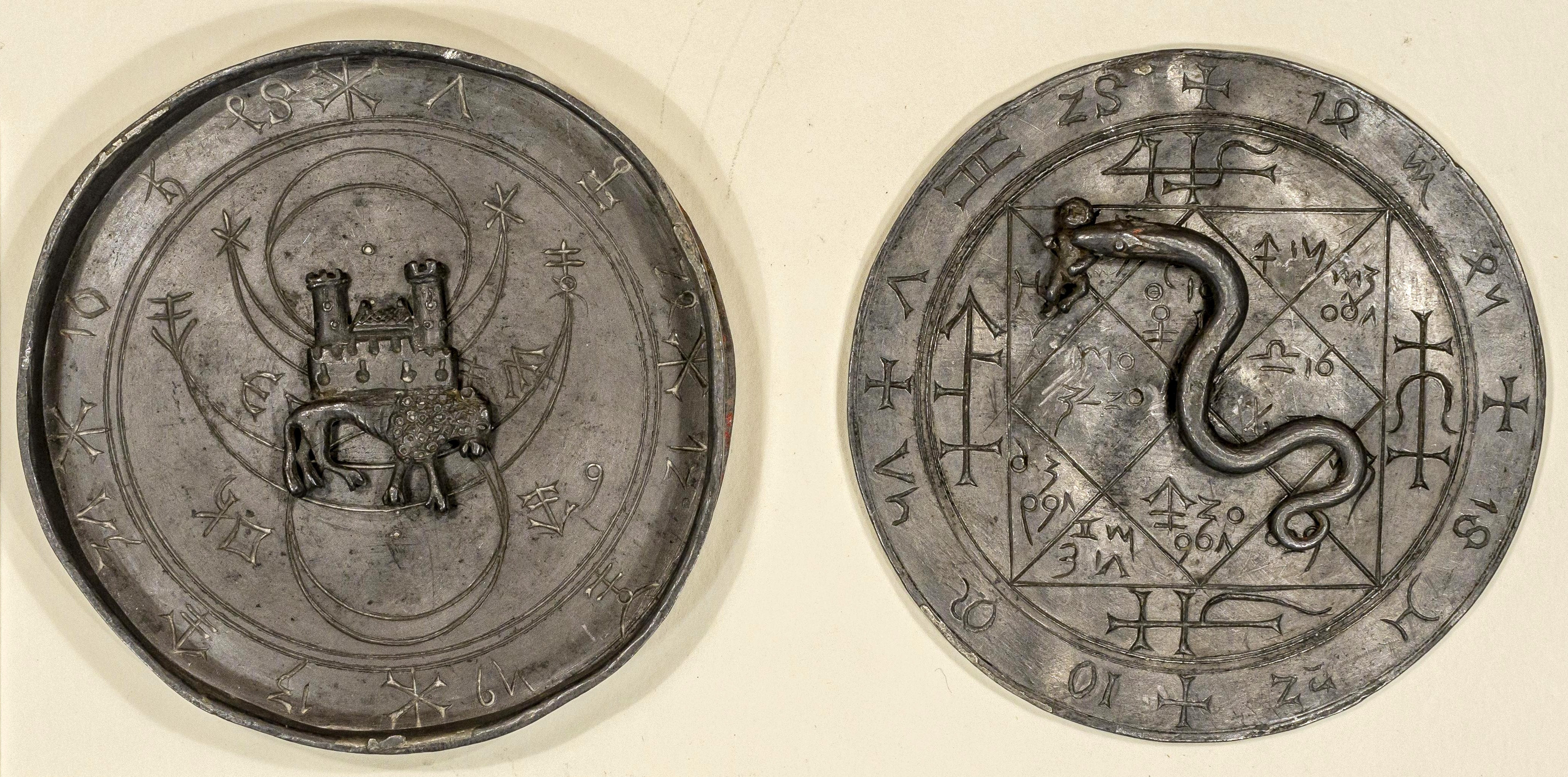
Amulet from Stürtzel's residence

In parallel to his academic functions Konrad was advisor to Archduke Sigismund of Austria since 1474. In 1481 he changed completely from the university to the court of Sigismund in Innsbruck and became his chancellor in 1486. When the upper classes of society (Ständegesellschaft) of Tyrol became unsatisfied with his misgovernment Sigismund was compelled to hand over the leadership to King Maximilian I. In 1490 Konrad was significantly involved in organising the transfer of power from Sigismund to Maximilian. Konrad was in attendance on the Roman-German King as his Chancellor of Tyrol. Obviously in return for his support he was ennobled by Frederick III. on January 24, 1488 which was confirmed three years later by his son Maximilian who granted the name Sturtzl von Buchen on July 4, 1491 in Nuremberg.

The political significance of Chancellor Stürtzel grew as Maximilian put the chancellery in Innsbruck more and more in charge of duties of the whole Empire. But Maximilian's plan to make the court chancellery (Hofkanzlei) a chancellery of the Empire (Reichskanzlei) got into a grim conflict with Archbishop Berthold von Henneberg who was Elector (Kurfürst) and Archchancellor of the German part of the Empire. At the Imperial Diet (Reichstag) 1495 in the city of Worms it came to a constitutional dispute about the relationship between the king and the estates of the realm (Stände) leading to the Imperial Reform. In these negotiations during the following Imperial Diets Stürtzel and other advisors had to act for the king who was often absent. When Maximilian lost Milan to the French king Charles VIII he lost power and influence in his empire and the court chancellery was withdrawn from all imperial duties 1500. Then Konrad asked for his retirement and was honorably discharged and allowed to keep his titles until the end of his life. Nevertheless he was mandated for several diplomatic missions after his retirement. Konrad was also engaged in many foreign affairs acting as a delegate of Sigismund and later Maximilian in negotiations with the Duke of Milan, with the dukedoms Geldern, Friesland and the Swiss.

During his career Stürtzel gained considerable assets. On the one hand, the Chancellor of the court was paid very well, but he also knew how to invest his money profitably. In 1491 he bought the villages Buchheim, Holzhausen and Hugstetten northwest of Freiburg as a fiefdom (Lehen) covering all rights and inhabitants. Beside that he bought seven neighboring houses in the center of Freiburg near the Gothic Münster and rebuilt them in the 1490s into one large residence which was the largest private house in town at that time. This was later known as 'Basler Hof' as it belonged from 1587 to the cathedral chapter (Domkapitel) of Basel and after 1651 the government of Further Austria (Vorderösterreich) was located there. From 1933-1941 the Gestapo was located there and it was mainly destroyed in 1944 during World War II. Reconstructed in 1951 it serves today as headquarters of the government of South-Baden.

In 1505 a new chorus was built in the Freiburg Minster and Konrad sponsored the first chapel for the grave of his family. He ordered two stained-glass windows with a picture of himself and his family which were drafted by Hans Baldung several years after Konrad's death and finalized about 1530. The windows were replaced in 1910 by copies as the original windows are in bad condition. Also in 1505 Konrad commissioned Hans Wydyz to fabricate a Three-Kings-Altar for his residence which can still be seen in the Minster today. Konrad was married twice. His first wife was Elisabeth Griesser and his second wife was Ursula Laucher.

His hometown Kitzingen, the city of Freiburg and the village Buchheim nearby named a street after him.
