= Hans Wydyz =

German sculptor and artist (c.1470–1520)

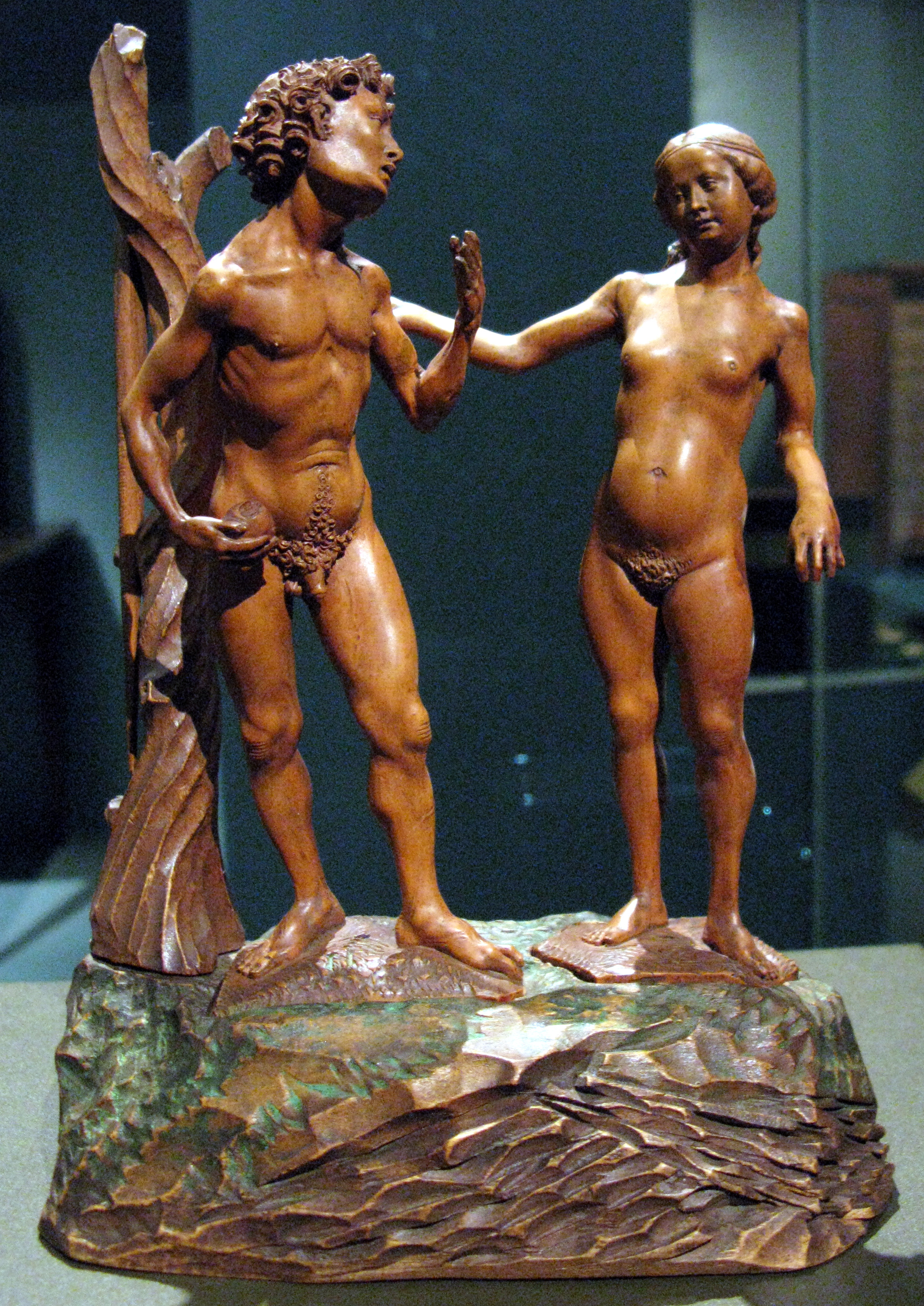
Adam and Eve by Hans Wydyz

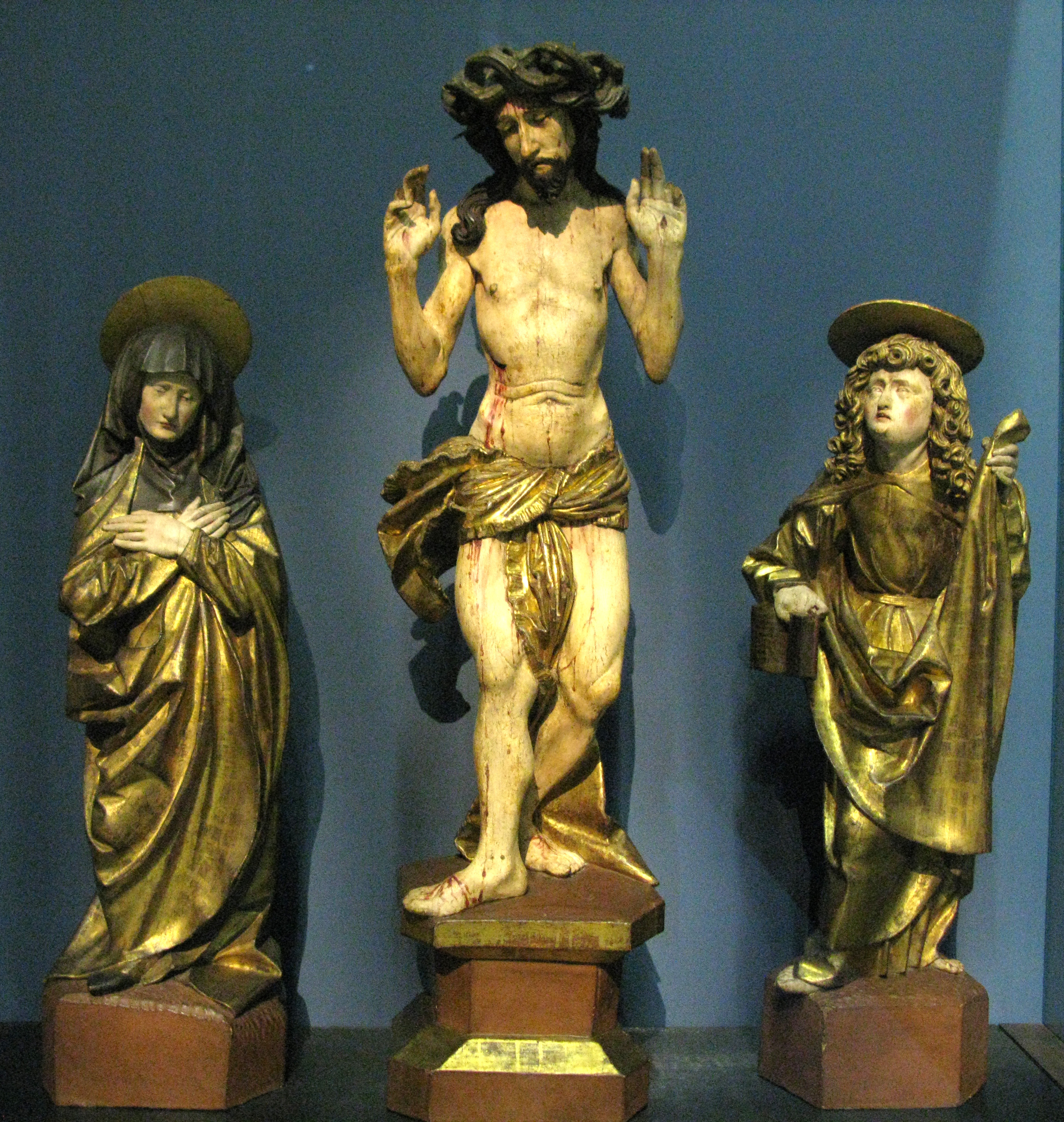
Christ from the Three Kings Altar in Freiburg

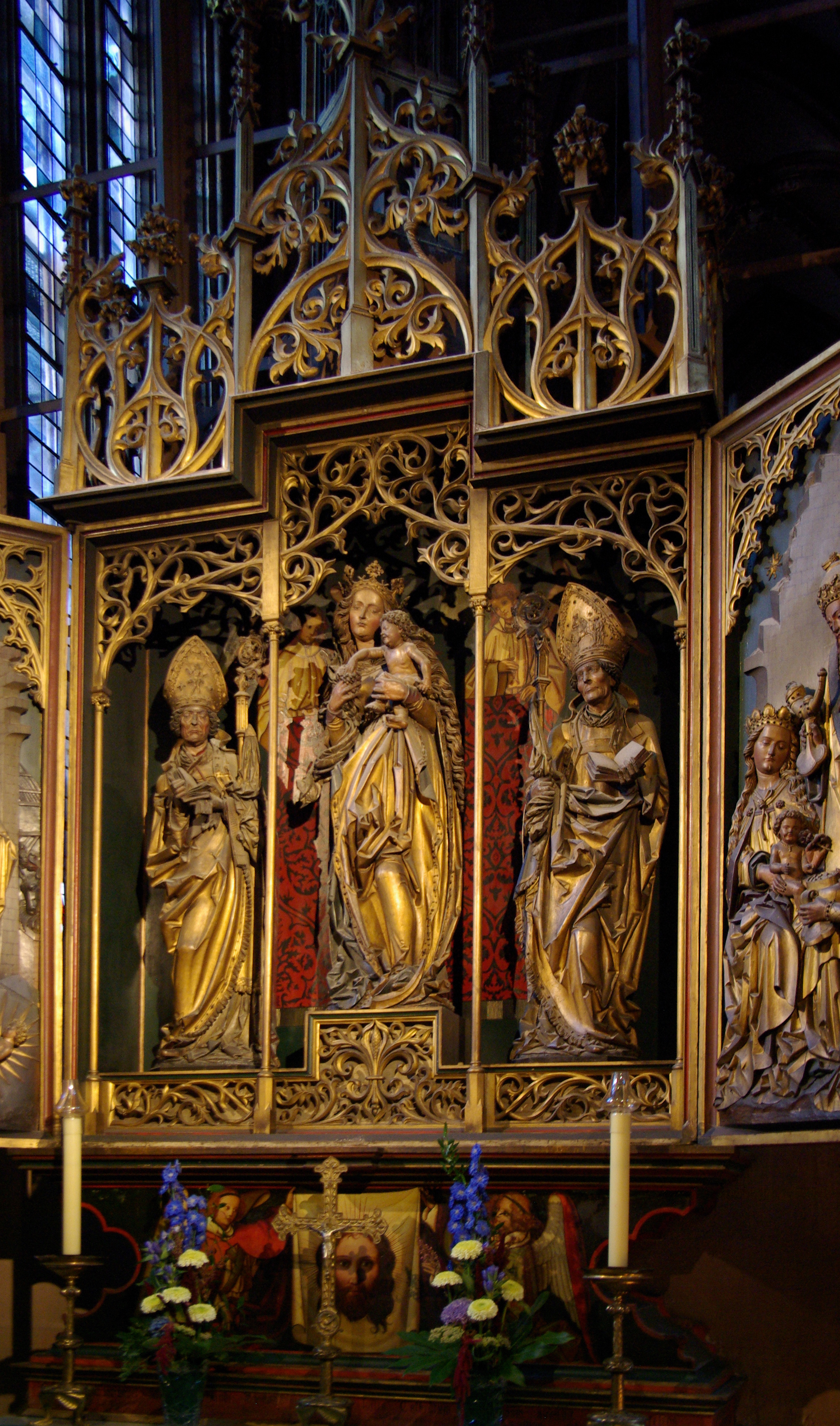
Marienaltar in Mainz

Hans Wydyz or Weiditz the Elder (c.1470–1520) was a sculptor and artist operating in Germany in the early 16th century. His work is usually signed H. W. near the base. He sculpted mainly in wood and also created woodcuts.

His work is not only highly accurate on a technical level, but is also abnormally charged with emotion, usually due to the expression on faces, hand gestures, poses etc.

== Life ==
Hans Wydyz the Elder is thought to come from the Upper Rhine region of Germany, probably born in or near Strasbourg, as his work appears to evolve from the Strasbourg tradition. He was probably the son of the wood engraver Bartholomaus Wydyz or Weiditz from Meissen.

He was active in the late 15th and early 16th centuries mainly in Saxony and (Freiburg im Breisgau) and later in Strasbourg.

From 1497 to 1510 he lived with his wife in Augustinergasse (now Grunwalderstrasse) in Freiburg.

His sculpture of Adam and Eve in boxwood and linden dates from around 1505 and is one of the first small scale sculptures of these figures. It was possibly made for domestic purposes, as it is carved in the round, and designed to be seen from all sides. The statue was once in the ownership of Margaret of Austria, Regent of the Netherlands.

Hans Sixt succeeded him in Freiburg and was probably trained by him.

In his later years he worked in partnership with Hans Baldung, probably with Baldung painting the figures carved by Wydyz.

He died in Freiburg im Breisgau in 1536.

== Family ==
It is not so much the commonality of the names which demonstrates that the Wydyz/Weiditz artists were all related, but the commonality of the artistic talent, which is clearly linked.

His sons were Hans Weiditz the Younger (c.1495-1537) and Christoph Weiditz (1498-1560). His sons were less skilled than the father and mainly worked in 2-dimensions, mainly low relief and woodcuts.

== Notable works ==
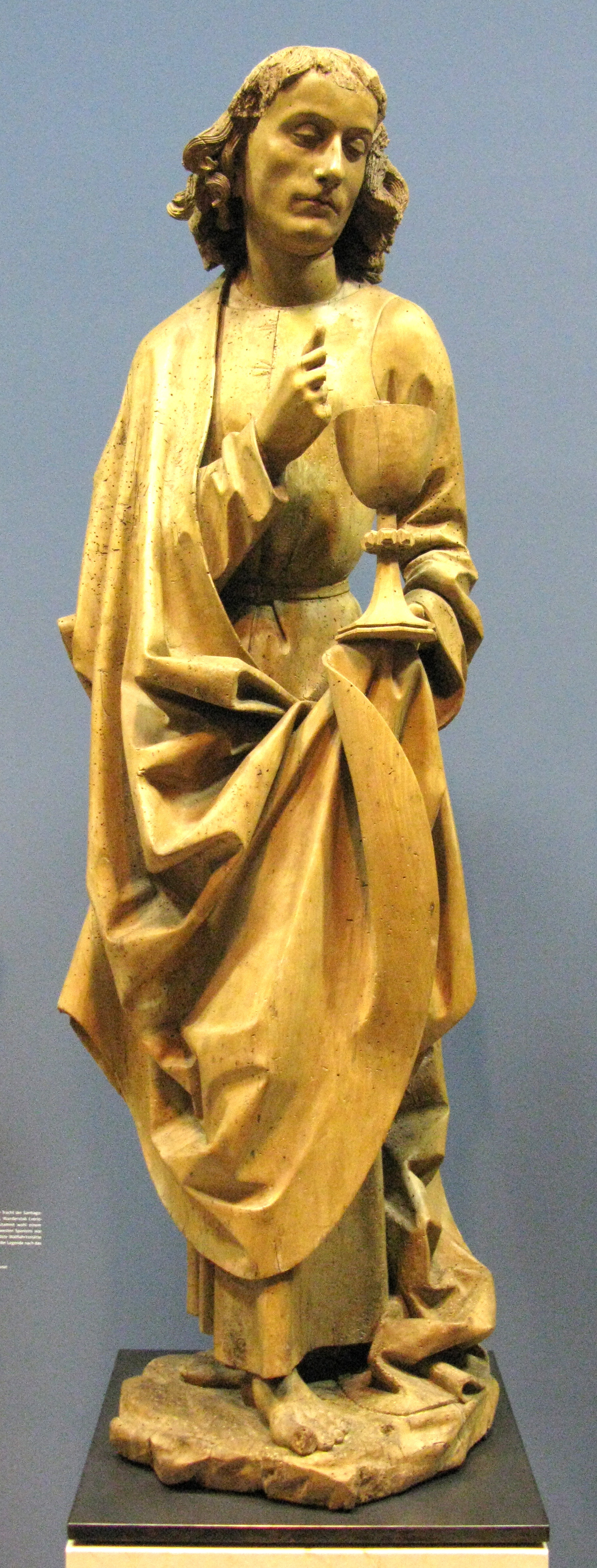
St John the Apostle by Wydyz

- The Virgin Mary, Victoria and Albert Museum, London
- Adam and Eve, History Museum, Basel
- The Three Kings altar in Freiburg Cathedral
- Marienaltar in Mainz Cathedral
- Crucifixion, Metropolitan Museum of New York
- St. Agnes of Rome Augustiner Museum, Freiburg
- St. Catherine of Alexandria, Town Hall, Obernai
- Three alabaster figures on the pulpit of Strasbourg Cathedral
- Kneeling Angel, in the Women's Museum in Strasbourg
- St John the Apostle from St Lawrence Church in Kenzingen (now in the Augustinermuseum in Freiburg)
- St Agnes from the Adelhausen monastery in Freiburg (now in the Augustinermuseum in Freiburg)
- Altar to St Anthony in the church of St Joseph in Obersimonswald
- The Crescent Madonna in the church of St Peter and Paul in Freiburg
- The Crescent Madonna in the Augustiner Museum, Freiburg
- Praying Maria in the Augustiner Museum, Freiburg
- The Annunciation, Bode Museum, Berlin
- Three bosses from the vaulting of Freiburg Cathedral now in the Augustiner Museum
- Holy Family on a Grassy Bank, altarpiece of the Schnewlin Church
- Six Crescent Marias in the Art Institute of Chicago
- Two enthroned Madonnas, Baden State Museum
- Anna Selbdritt from St George's Church in Ehrenstetten, now in the Augustiner Museum
- The Oswald Altar from St Oswald's in Höllental
- St. Sebastian and St. Christopher, Museum of Art History in Saverne
- Madonna and Child flanked by St. Vitus and Pope Marcellus I, Strasbourg Museum
- Two Crescent Madonnas in the Humanist Library in Schlettstadt
- Two saints in the parish church of St Dionysius in Baden-Oos
- Altarpiece from the Pankratius Church in Dangolsheim, now in Strasbourg Cathedral
- Altarpiece in St Michael's Church in Beiertheim
- Crucifixion in Bode Museum in Berlin
- The Suffering of Job, Museum in Freiburg
