= Hans Sixt =

German sculptor

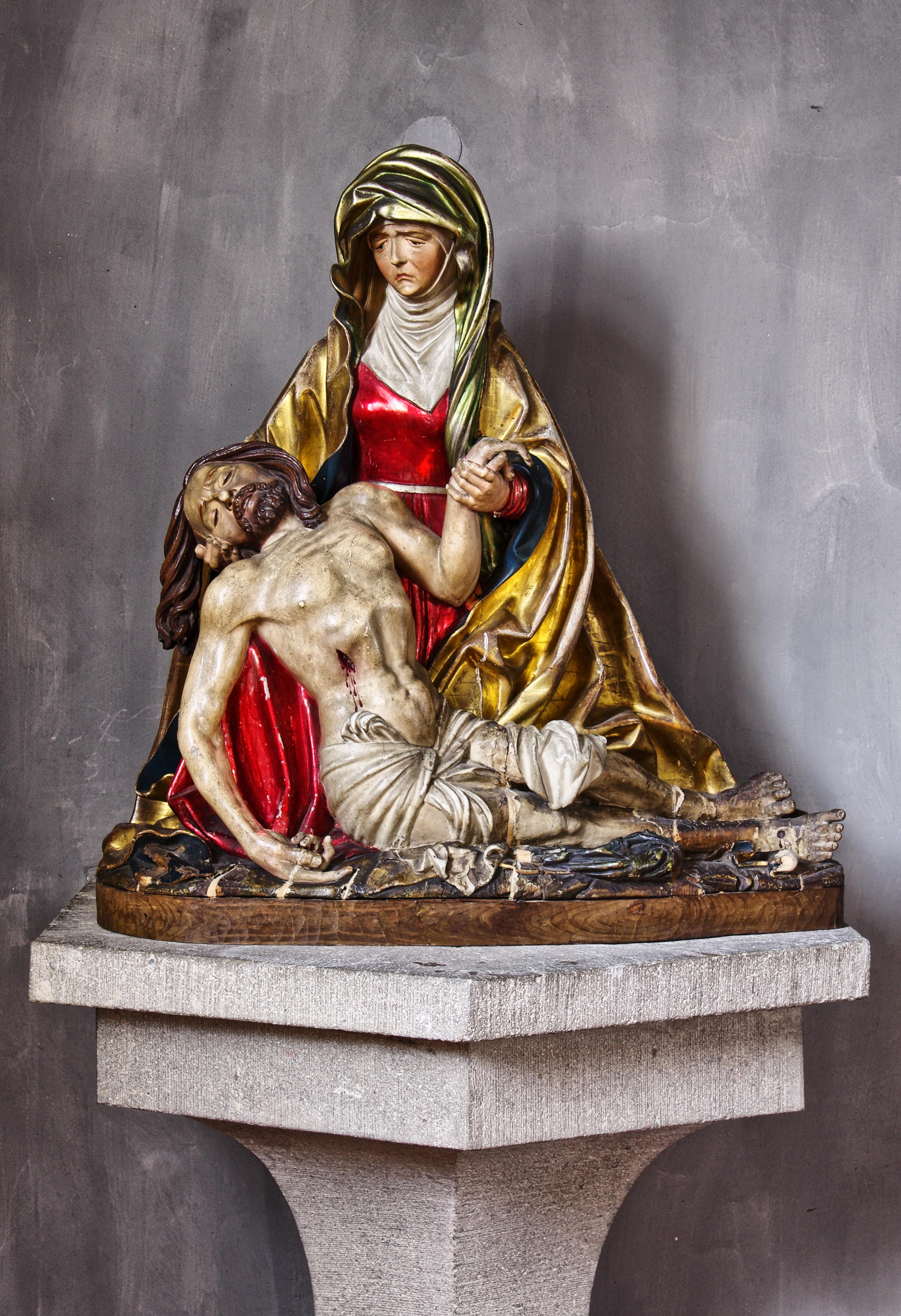
Pieta in St Martin

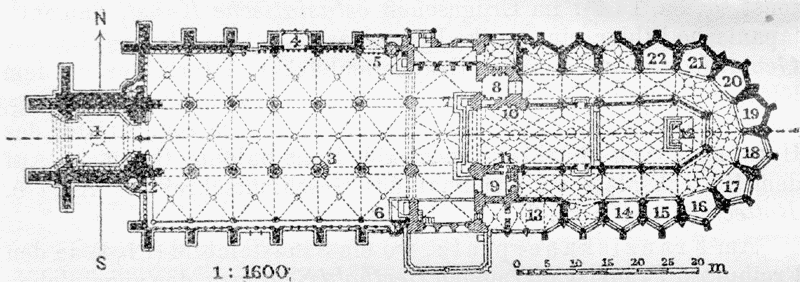
The position of the Locherer Altarpiece (22) in Freiburg

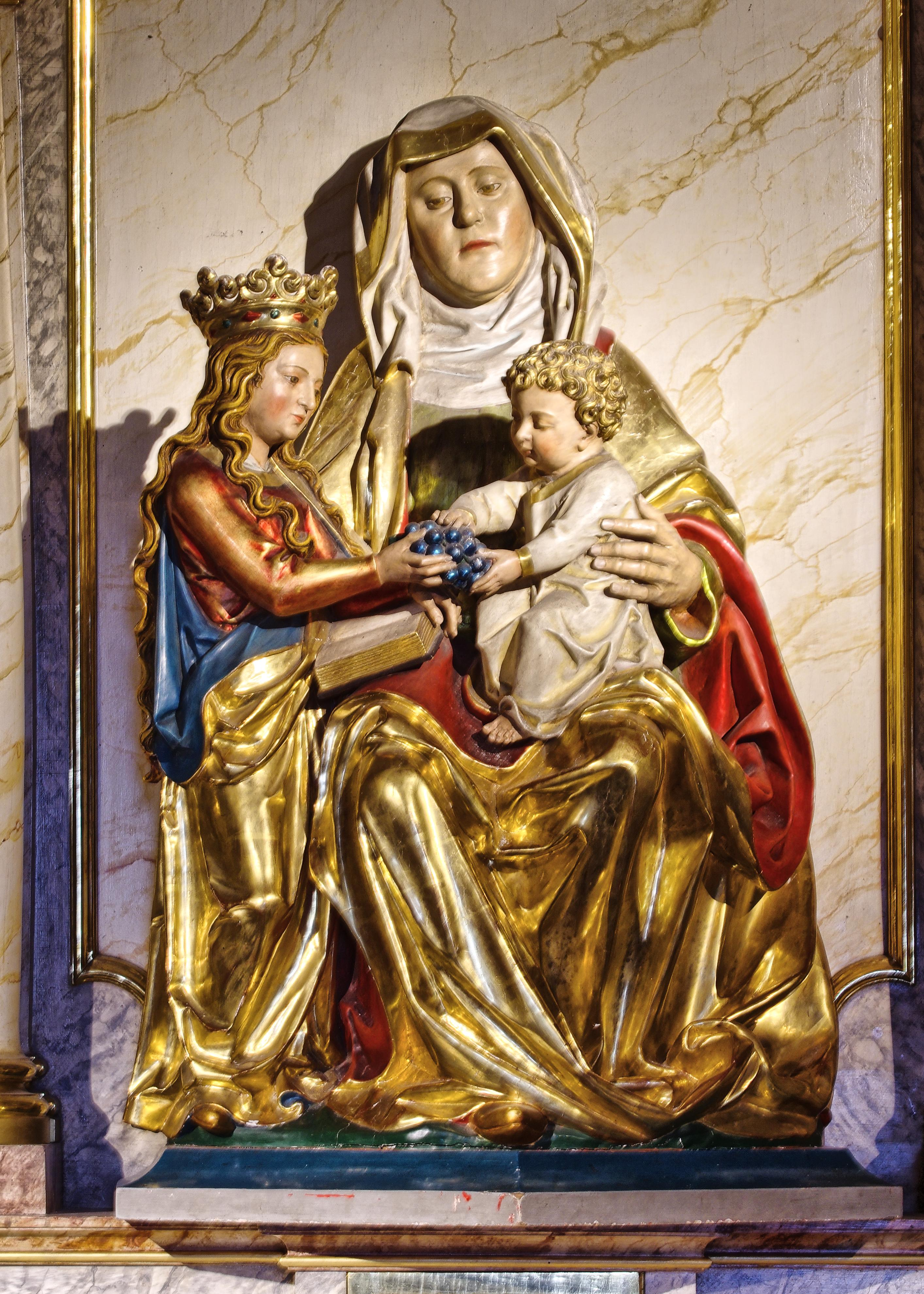
Madonna and child with prince at St Martin by Hans Sixt

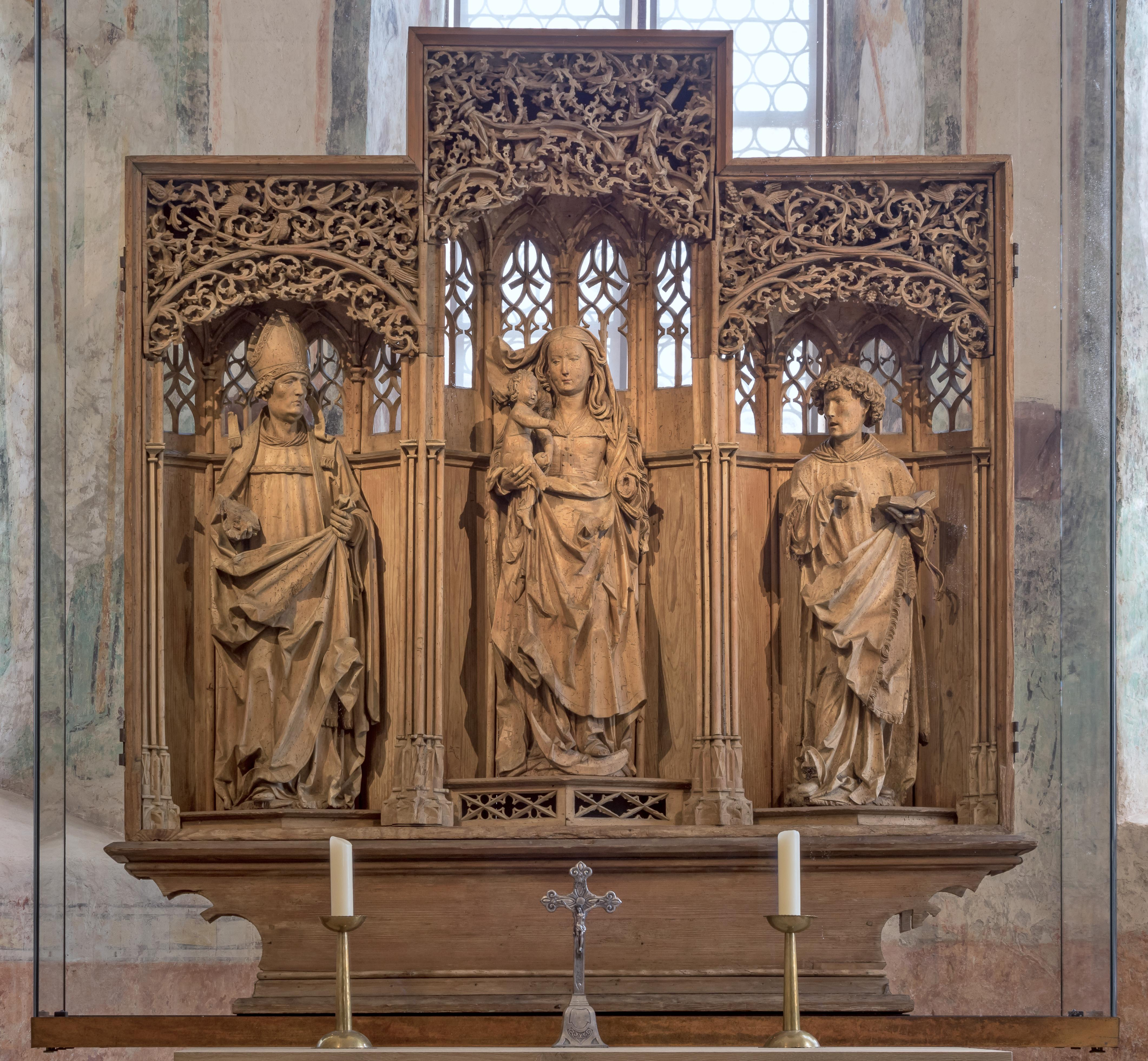
St Vitus altarpiece

Hans Sixt (or Sixtein or Sigstein) (c. 1490 – c. 1550) was a 16th-century German wood sculptor in the tradition of Hans Wydyz, remembered for his ornate altarpieces. Mid-20th century academics often (unhelpfully) refer to him simply as Staufen (his birthplace rather than his name).

== Life ==
Sixt lived in Staufen im Breisgau and worked nearby in Freiburg im Breisgau.

He appears to have trained under Tilman Riemenschneider, or his followers, in Würzburg. He then worked with under Hans Wydyz alongside Wydyz's sons, Hans Weiditz and Christoph Weiditz. He worked with Wydyz's partner, Hans Baldung, who painted Sixt's carvings.

His signed works begin in 1515. His most important work, the Locherer chapel in Freiburg Minster was begun in 1521 and completed in 1524.

From 1534 he supplanted Wydyz as the principal sculptor in the area.

He died around 1550 in Staufen.

== Recognition ==
Sixtgasse in Staufen is named after him.

In 1937 the playwright Hermann Ays wrote the play "Sixt von Stoufen".

== Main works ==
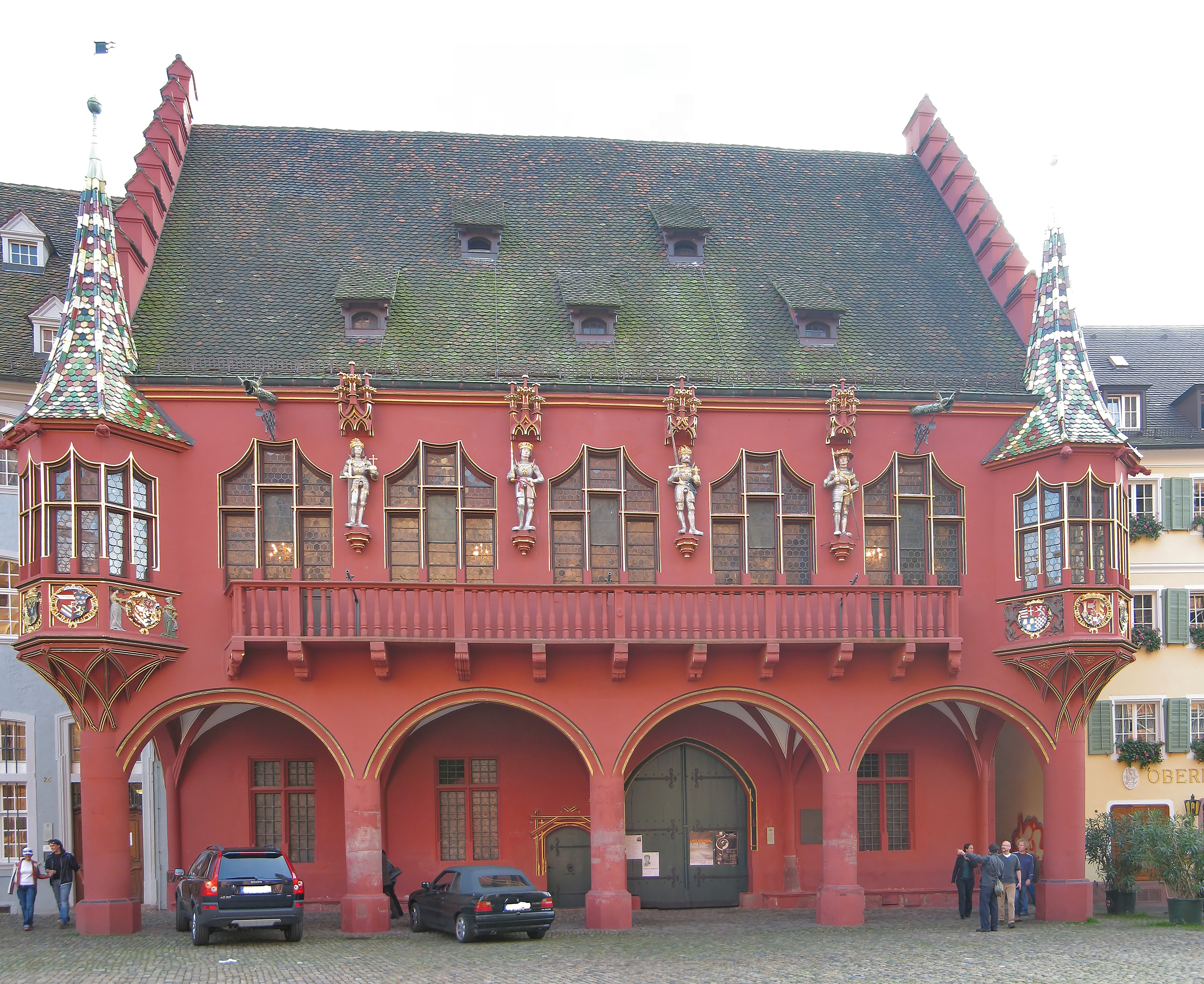
Sixt's figures on the shop in Feiburg

- The Locherer Altarpiece in Freiburg Minster (1521 to 1524)
- Angels behind the Levite Chair in Freiburg Minster (1527)
- Decoration of the organ, Freiburg Minster (1530)
- St Vitus altarpiece at Wasenweiler
- Monument to Heinrich Glarean in Freiburg Minster
- Figures on the historic shop in Freiburg

In 1827 Johann Nepomuk Locherer commissioned Dominikus Glanz to alter the Locherer altarpiece including painting over the original paint scheme (probably by Hans Baldung in brown paint to better express the pure timber sculpture. This ill-advised change was partially reversed in a restoration of 1948.
