= Otto Brunfels =

German botanist and theologian (1488–1534)

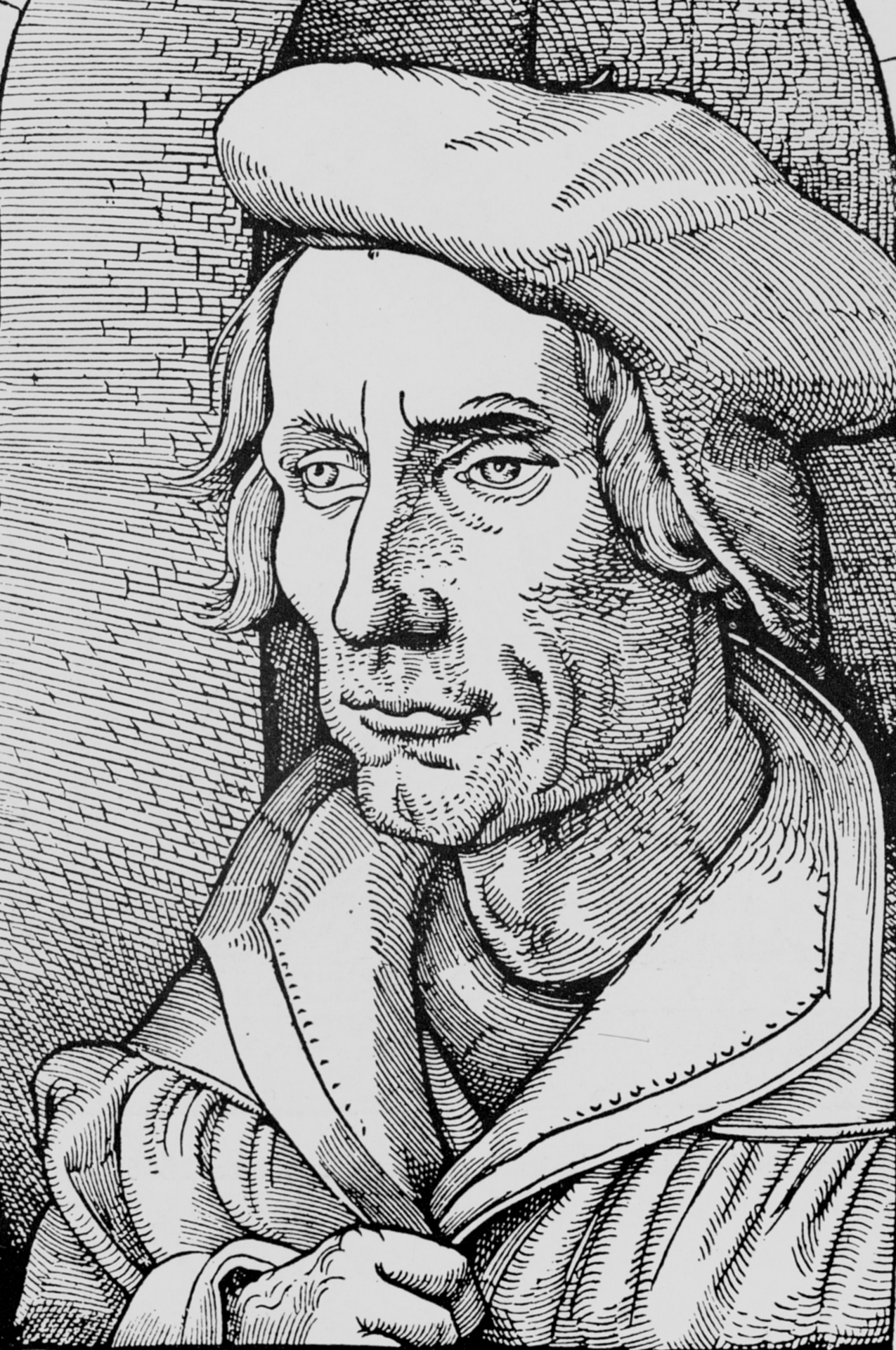
- Portrait by Hans Baldung, c. 1534
- Born: 1488 near Mainz, Electorate of Mainz
- Died: 23 November 1534 (aged 45–46); Bern, Swiss Confederacy
- Education: University of Mainz
- Church: Lutheran
- Writings: Catalogi virorum illustrium Herbarum vivae eicones

Otto Brunfels (also known as Brunsfels or Braunfels) (believed to be born in 1488 – 23 November 1534) was a German theologian and botanist. Carl von Linné listed him among the "Fathers of Botany".

== Life ==
After studying theology and philosophy at the University of Mainz, Brunfels entered a Carthusian monastery in Mainz and later resettled to another Carthusian monastery at Königshofen near Strasbourg. In Strasbourg he got in contact with a learned lawyer Nikolaus Gerbel (they met in person in 1519). Gerbel drew Brunfels' attention to the healing powers of plants and thus gave the impetus to the further botanical investigations.

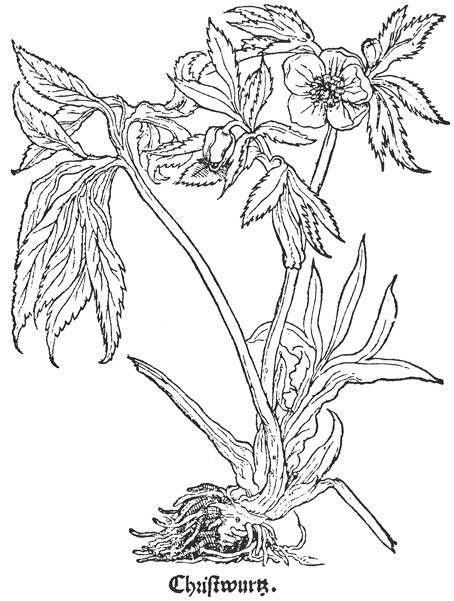
"Christwurz" (Helleborus niger) from Herbarum vivae eicones (1530–1536)

After the conversion to Protestantism (supported by Franz von Sickingen and Ulrich von Hutten), upon the insistence of the Dean of Frankfurt Johann Indagine, Brunfels became a minister at Steinau an der Straße (1521) and later, in Neuenburg am Rhein. After that he served for eight years as the head of a Carmelite school in Strasbourg. In the list of most important heretics published by the order of the Emperor by the University of Leuven (1550), Brunfels was listed first.

In one of his works he defended Ulrich von Hutten against Erasmus of Rotterdam and published the manuscripts from the Jan Hus heritage. Brunfels' Catalogi virorum illustrium 1527 is considered to be the first book on the history of evangelical Church.

After his friend Ulrich von Hutten had died (1523), Brunfels' religious views brought him into a controversy with Martin Luther and Huldrych Zwingli. Later on he began to study medicine at the University of Basel, (MD 1532). In 1532 Brunfels became a city physician (Stadtarzt) in Bern, where he stayed till the end of his life.

Besides of his numerous theological works, Brunfels published treatises on pedagogics, Arabic language, pharmaceutics, entomology and botany. He is often called a father of botany, because, in his botanical writings, he relied not so much on the ancient authors as on his own observations and described plants according to the latter. In his Herbarum vivae eicones (1530 and 1536, in three parts) and Contrafayt Kräuterbuch (1532–1537, in two parts), the German plants he himself found during his botanical studies are represented with woodcuts (by Hans Weiditz) under their German vernacular names. However, Duane Isely attributes much of Brunfels' popularity to Weiditz, whose woodcuts set a new standard technically, and were done from life, rather being copied from previous works. Brunfels also introduced information about German plants not found in Dioscorides, and described them independently of their medical values, although the descriptions are often poorly written.

A plant genus Brunfelsia (Solanaceae) is named after him.

== Works ==
- Othonis Brvnfelsii Pro Vlricho Hutteno defuncto ad Erasmi Roter. Spongiam Responsio (1523)
- Processus consistorialis Martyrii Io. Huss (1524); German edition: Geistl. Bluthandel Iohannis Hussz zu Constenz (1524 or 1525)
- Pandectarum Veteris et Novi Testamenti (1527)
- Catalogi virorum illustrium veteris et novi testamenti (1527)
- Catechesis puerorum in fide, in literis et in moribus (1529)
- Herbarum vivae eicones, 3 Bde. (1530–36)
- Catalogus illustrium medicorum seu de primis medicinae scriptoribus (1530)
- Iatron medicamentorum simplicium (1533)
- Contrafayt Kreüterbuch (mit naturgetreuen Abb. v. Hans Weiditz), 2 Vols., (1532–1537)
- Onomastikon medicinae, continens omnia nomina herbarum, fruticum etc. (1534)
- Epitome medices, summam totius medicinae complectens (1540)
- In Dioscoridis historiam plantarum certissima adaptatio (1543)
- Von allerhandt apotheckischen Confectionen, Lattwergen, Oel, Pillulen, Träncken, Trociscen, Zucker scheiblein, Salben unnd Pflastern etc. : wie, wenn und warzu man jeses brauchen soll. Gülfferich, Frankfurt am Main (1552)

== Sources ==
- Bautz, Friedrich Wilhelm (1975). "Braunfels (Brunfels), Otto (Otho)". In Bautz, Friedrich Wilhelm (ed.). Biographisch-Bibliographisches Kirchenlexikon (BBKL) (in German). Vol. 1. Hamm: Bautz. cols. 735–736. ISBN 3-88309-013-1.
- Isely, Duane (2002). One Hundred and One Botanists. West Lafayette, Indiana: Purdue University Press. pp. 17–19. ISBN 978-1-55753-283-1. OCLC 947193619.
- Jahn, Ilse, ed. Geschichte der Biologie. Spektrum 2000
- Mägdefrau, Karl. Geschichte der Botanik. Fischer, Stuttgart 1973, S. 20–36.
- Meyers Konversationslexikon 1888–1889
