= Hans Weiditz =

German Renaissance artist (1495–c. 1537)

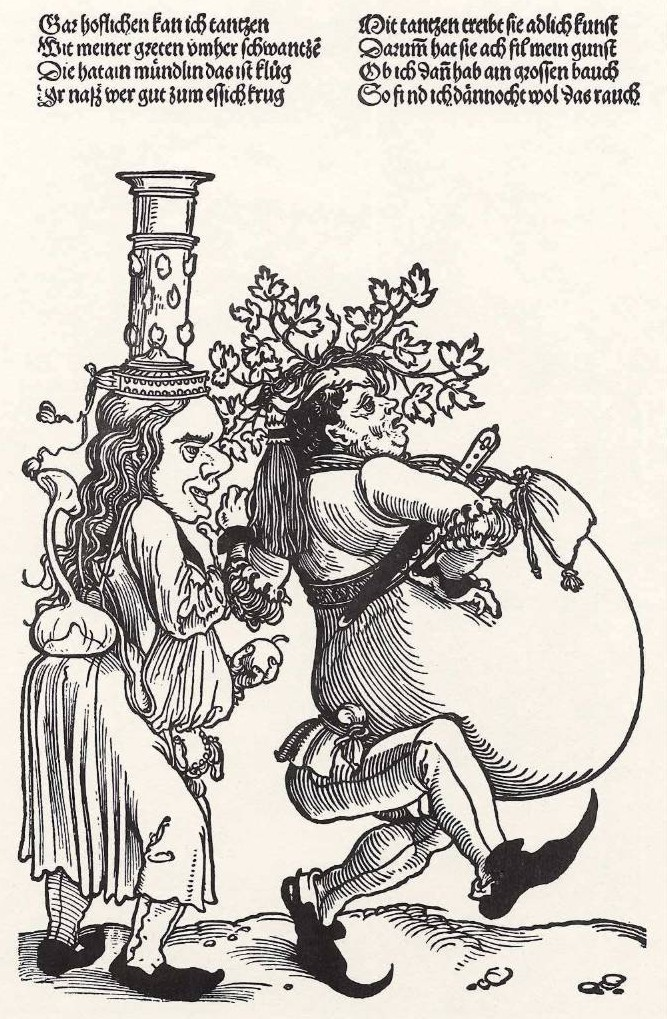
Caricature of dancer and friend

Hans Weiditz the Younger, Hans Weiditz der Jüngere, Hans Weiditz II (1495 Freiburg im Breisgau – c. 1537 Bern), was a German Renaissance artist, also known as The Petrarch Master for his woodcuts illustrating Petrarch's De remediis utriusque fortunae, or Remedies for Both Good and Bad Fortune, or Phisicke Against Fortune. He is best known today for his very lively scenes and caricatures of working life and people, many created to illustrate the abstract philosophical maxims of Cicero and Petrarch.

Like most artists in woodcut he only designed the woodcuts, leaving the block-cutting to a specialist "Formschneider" (sometimes Jost de Negker in his Augsburg period) who pasted the design to the wood and chiselled the white areas away. The quality of the final woodcuts, which varies considerably, depended on the skill of the cutter as well as the artist. Weiditz was unfortunate in that his publishers went bankrupt part way through the production of his two longest series of woodcuts, and the cutting was later completed by cutters of lower skill.

== Life ==
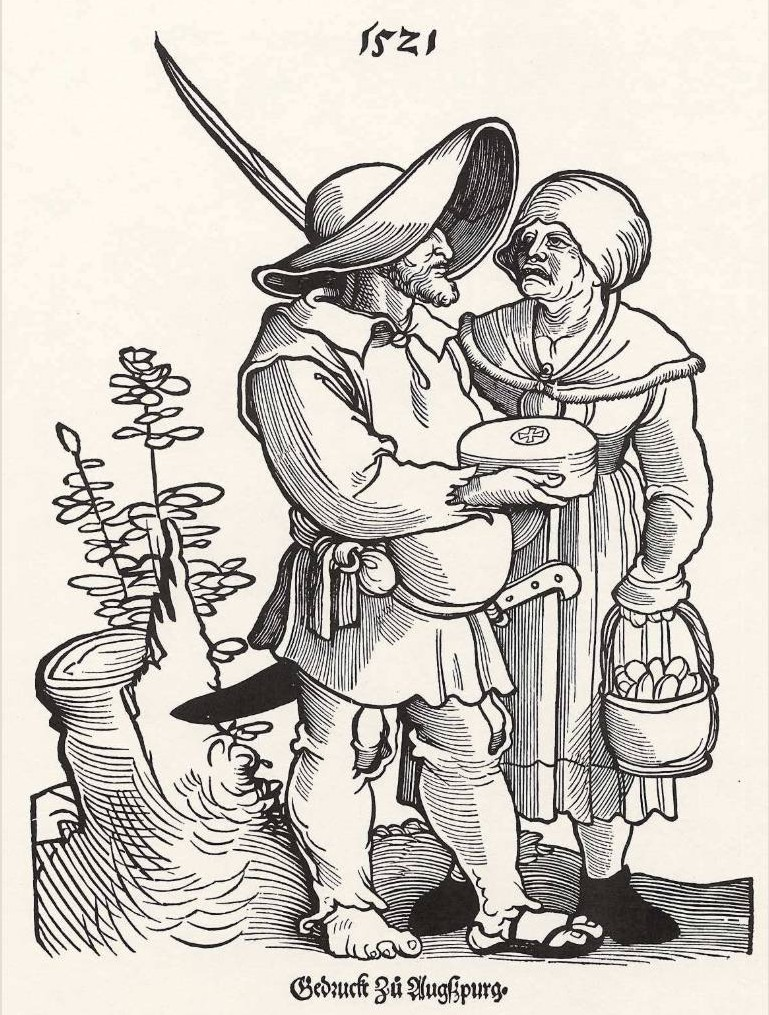
Cheesemaker and his wife

His father, Hans Wydyz or Weiditz the Elder (ca. 1475 Strasbourg - ca. 1516 Strasbourg), worked in Freiburg im Breisgau between 1497 and 1514, and was described as a 'bildhower' or sculptor in the Painters' Guild records. In 1505 he worked on the Dreikönigsaltar in Freiburg Cathedral. Parish records show a 1510 payment to him for carved wooden rosettes on the keystones in the chancel, working with Hans Baldung, the gifted student of Albrecht Dürer. He is not to be confused with the slightly older Strasbourg woodcut artist Hans Wechtlin.

Weiditz the Younger, a brother of Christoph Weiditz (1500-1559), was a prominent member of an elite group of woodcut artists including such figures as Albrecht Dürer, Hans Holbein, and Hans Burgkmair, his teacher. He was active in Augsburg between 1512 and 1522, and from 1522 to 1536 in Straßburg, producing woodcuts for book illustrations in the style of Burgkmair. He also produced notable work for an edition of Cicero's popular De Officiis in 1531, for Apuleius' The Golden Ass (1538), and the Comedies of Plautus.

He produced the German chiaroscuro woodcut with the most different colour blocks, a seven-block coat of arms of a cardinal, for a book frontispiece of 1520, probably cut by Jost de Negker.

== Illustrations for the Herbarum vivae eicones ==
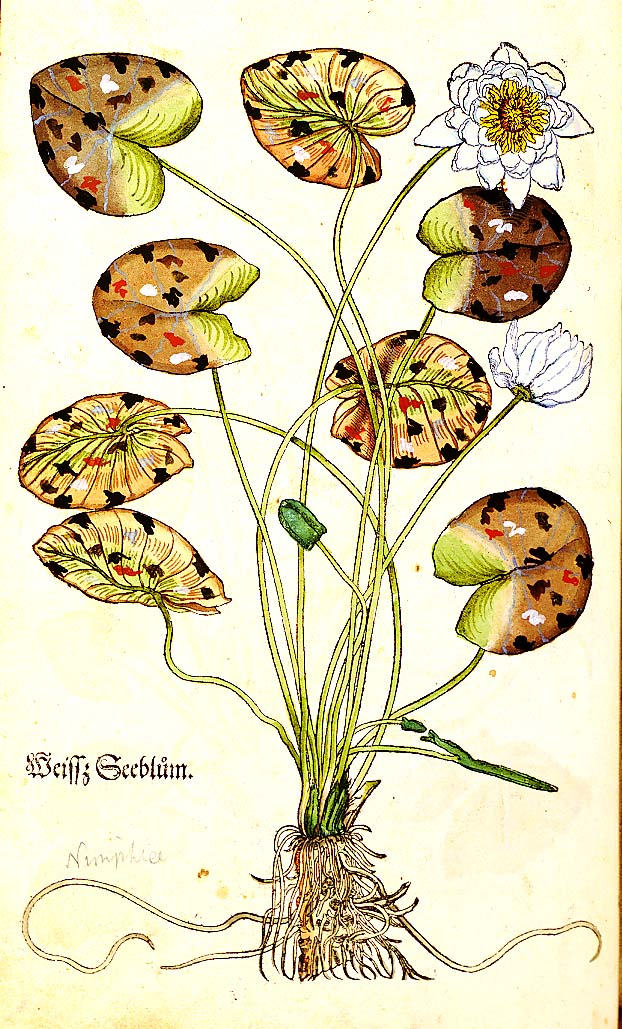
Plate from Herbarium Vivae Eicones, hand-coloured woodcut

The Herbarum vivae eicones (Living plant images), published in Strasbourg in three parts between 1530 and 1536, was a landmark publication in the development of botanical illustration. The text was compiled by Otto Brunfels from earlier writings, but the illustrations by Weiditz represented a novel approach and set a high standard of realism in the portrayal of plants. Weiditz took his plants from nature, often showing the changing appearance with the seasons. His technique was admired and inevitably copied, leading to a copyright infringement lawsuit against the publisher Christian Egenolff.

== Selected books illustrated by Hans Weiditz ==
- Der Altenn Fechter anfengliche Kunst, Christian Egenolff, (Frankfurt am Main 1529)
- Petrarch De remediis utriusque fortunae, or Remedies for Both Good and Bad Fortune, or Phisicke Against Fortune as well prosperous as adverse
- The Herbarum vivae eicones (Living plant images), published Strasbourg in three parts between 1530 and 1536—a landmark publication in botanical illustration, by Otto Brunfels

== See also ==
- List of florilegia and botanical codices
