= Freiburg Minster =

- The Cathedral of Our Lady
- Freiburger Münster
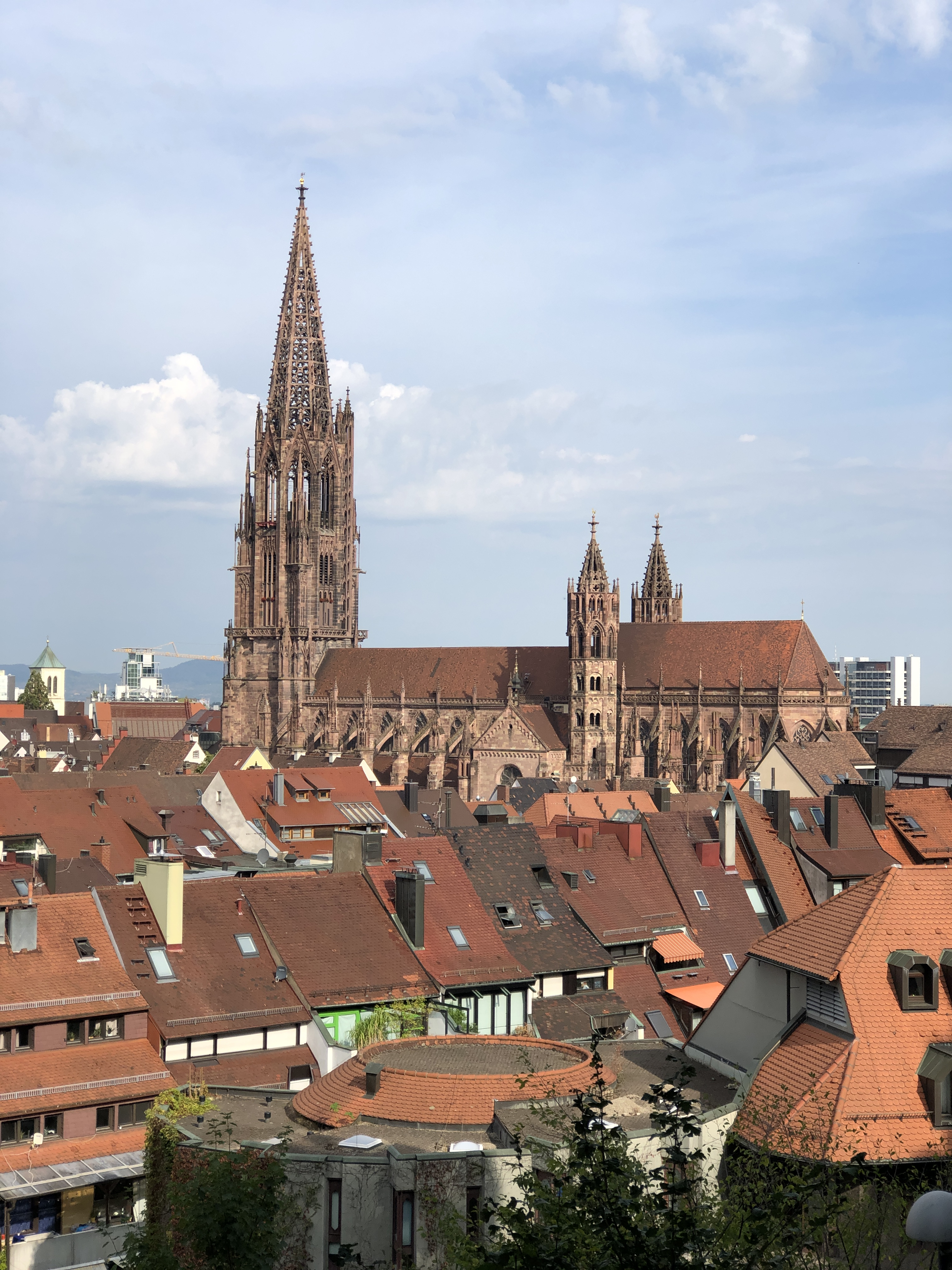
- 2022 view, looking northwest
- Freiburg Minster
- 47°59′44″N 7°51′11″E
- Location: Freiburg im Breisgau
- Country: Germany
- Denomination: Roman Catholic
- Website: Website of the Cathedral

History
- Status: Active
- Founded: 1200
- Founder: Berthold V, Duke of Zähringen

Architecture
- Functional status: Cathedral
- Completed: 1330

Administration
- Archdiocese: Archdiocese of Freiburg

Freiburg Minster (German: Freiburger Münster or Münster Unserer Lieben Frau) is the cathedral of Freiburg im Breisgau, southwest Germany. The last duke of Zähringen had started the building around 1200 in romanesque style. The construction continued in 1230 in Gothic style. The minster was partly built on the foundations of an original church that had been there from the beginning of Freiburg, in 1120.

In the Middle Ages, Freiburg lay in the Diocese of Konstanz. In 1827, Freiburg Minster became the seat of the newly established Catholic Archdiocese of Freiburg, and thus a cathedral.

== Architecture ==
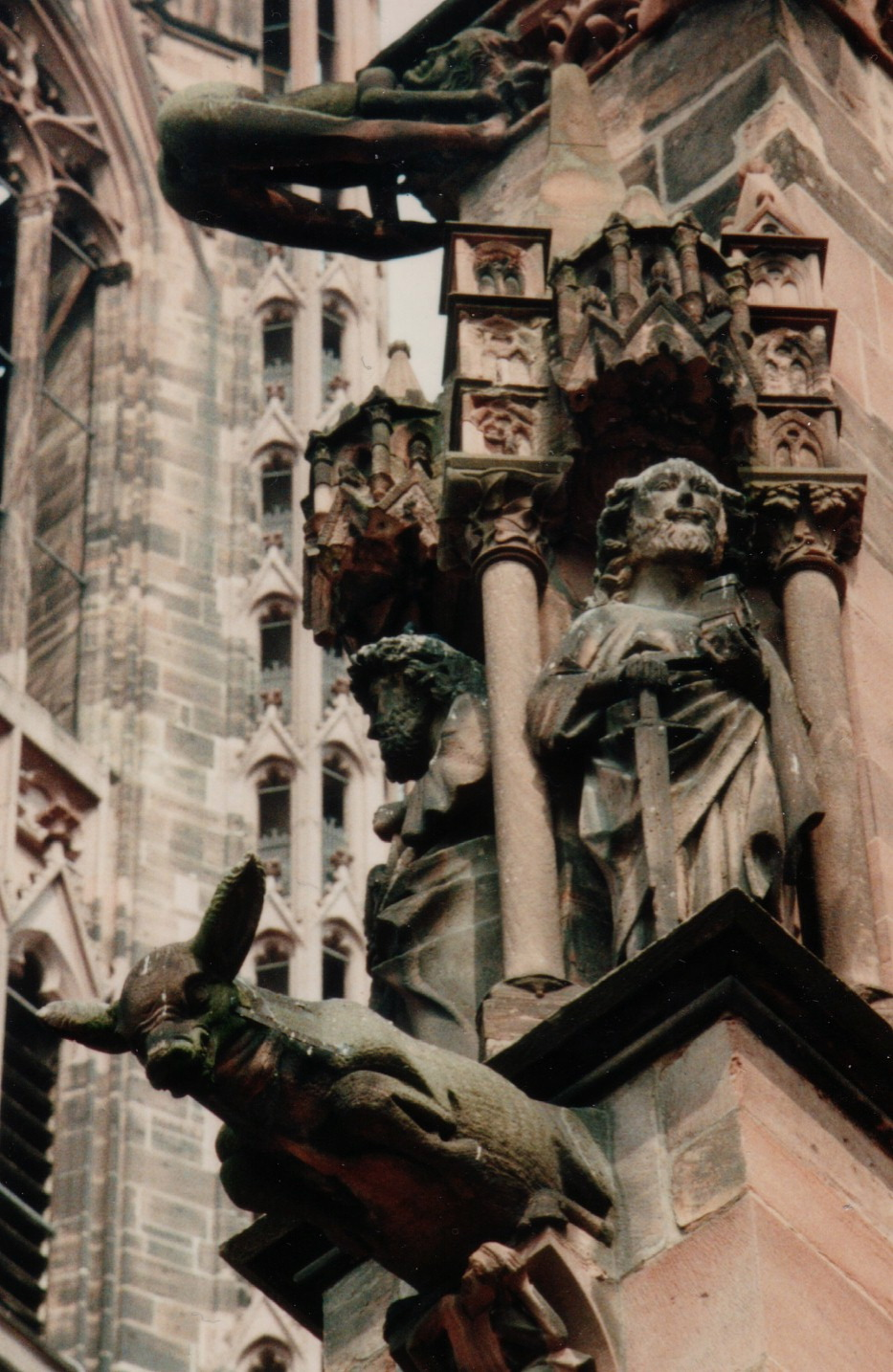
Waterspouts (gargoyles) and other statuary of Freiburg Minster

The Swiss historian Jacob Burckhardt once said that the church's 116-meter tower will forever remain the most beautiful spire on earth.

The tower is nearly square at the base, and at its centre is the dodecagonal star gallery. Above this gallery, the tower is octagonal and tapered, and above this, is the spire.

Freiburg Minster is the only Gothic church tower within the current borders of Germany that was completed in the Middle Ages (1330), considering the Strasbourg Cathedral is now located in France. Freiburg was not the seat of a bishop until 1827, long after it was built. The cathedral has lasted intact until the present, surviving the bombing raids of November 1944, which destroyed all of the houses on the west and north side of the market. The tower was subject to severe vibration at the time, and its survival of these vibrations is attributed to its lead anchors, which connect the sections of the spire. The windows had been taken out of the spire at the time by church staff led by Monsignor Max Fauler, and so these also suffered no damage.

The tower has 16 bells, the oldest being the "Hosanna" bell from 1258, which weighs 3,290 kilograms. This bell can be heard on Thursday evening after the Angelus, on Friday at 11:00 am (a time consequently known as "Spätzleglocke"), on Saturday evenings, and each year on 27 November in remembrance of the air raid.

== Interior ==
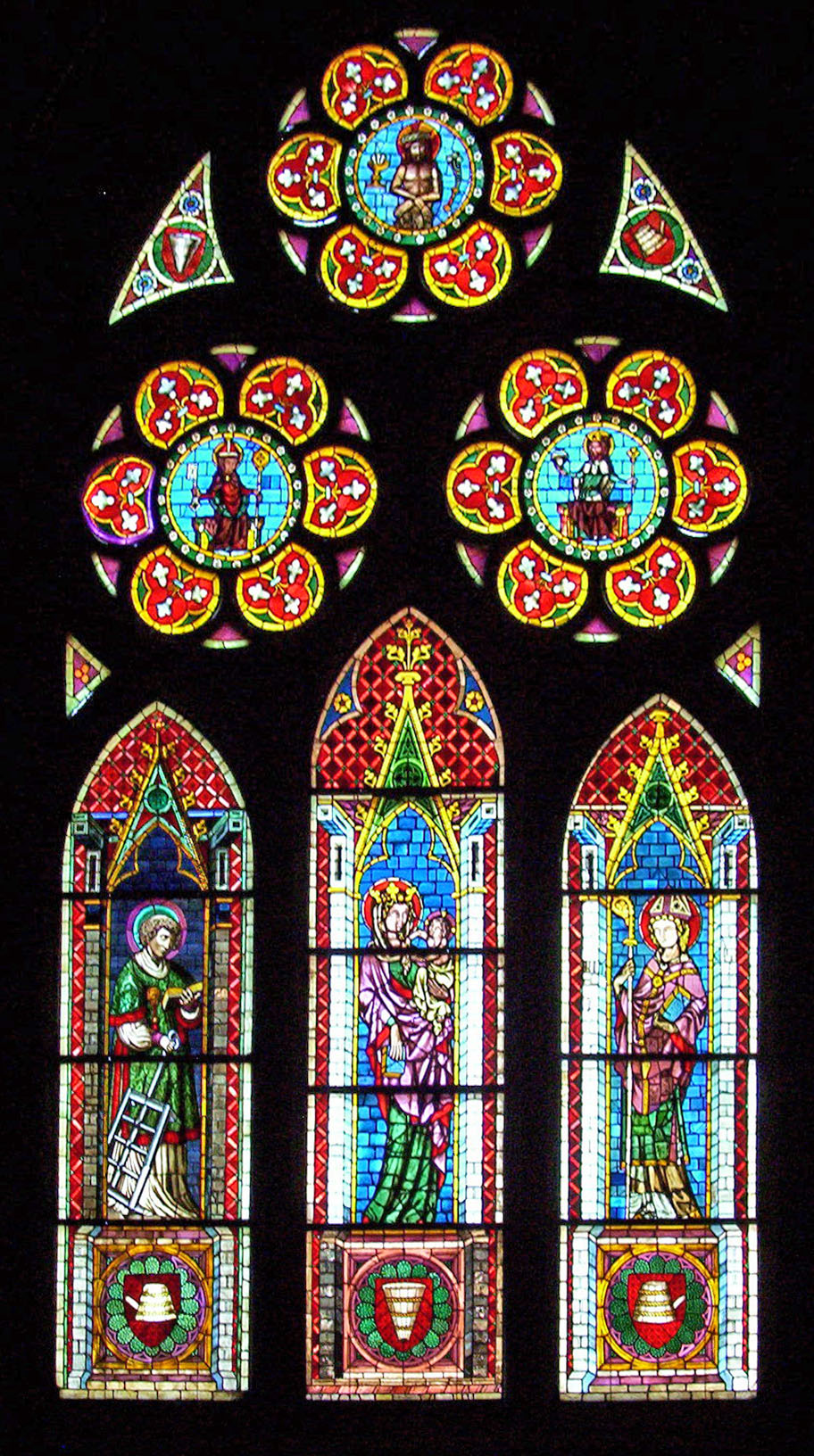
Window of Freiburg Minster

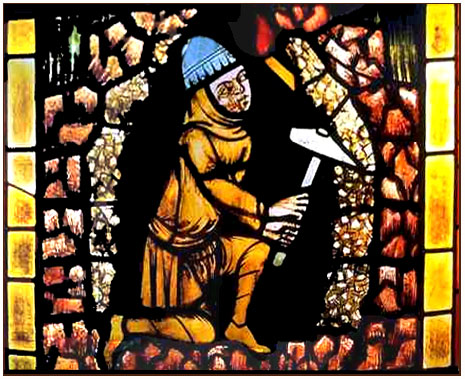
Freiburg Miner, stained glass, c. 1330

There are two important altars inside the cathedral: the high altar of Hans Baldung, and another altar of Hans Holbein the Younger in a side chapel.

The inner portal contains sculptures of the Ten Virgins.

The nave windows were donated by the guilds, and the symbols of the guilds are featured on them. The deep red color in some of the windows is not the result of a dye, but instead the result of a suspension of solid gold nanoparticles.

In 2003, the Lenten cloth was restored and backed with a supporting material. It now weighs over a ton, and so must be carried from the workshop with heavy machinery for its use during Lent.

== Bells ==
The cathedral holds 19 bells, altogether 25 tonnes, making it one of the largest peals in Germany.

Nr.	name	year cast	caster's name	cast at	diameter	measures	chime
1	Christus (Bourdon Bell)	1959	Friedrich Wilhelm Schilling	Heidelberg	2133 mm	6856 kg	g^{0}
2	Petrus	1959	Friedrich Wilhelm Schilling	Heidelberg	1774 mm	3917 kg	bes^{0}
3	Paulus	1959	Friedrich Wilhelm Schilling	Heidelberg	1566 mm	2644 kg	c^{1}
4	Maria	1959	Friedrich Wilhelm Schilling	Heidelberg	1490 mm	2290 kg	d^{1}
5	Hosanna	1258	anonymous		1610 mm	3290 kg	es^{1}
6	Josef	1959	Friedrich Wilhelm Schilling	Heidelberg	1242 mm	1354 kg	f^{1}
7	Nikolaus	1959	Friedrich Wilhelm Schilling	Heidelberg	1095 mm	958 kg	g^{1}
8	Johannes	1959	Friedrich Wilhelm Schilling	Heidelberg	1081 mm	913 kg	a^{1}
9	Jakobus	1959	Friedrich Wilhelm Schilling	Heidelberg	1022 mm	803 kg	bes^{1}
10	Konrad	1959	Friedrich Wilhelm Schilling	Heidelberg	903 mm	560 kg	c^{2}
11	Bernhard	1959	Friedrich Wilhelm Schilling	Heidelberg	798 mm	381 kg	d^{2}
12	Lambert und Alexander	1959	Friedrich Wilhelm Schilling	Heidelberg	670 mm	212 kg	f^{2}
13	Michael	1959	Friedrich Wilhelm Schilling	Heidelberg	594 mm	149 kg	g^{2}
14	Schutzengel	1959	Friedrich Wilhelm Schilling	Heidelberg	575 mm	150 kg	a^{2}
15	Odilia	1959	Friedrich Wilhelm Schilling	Heidelberg	505 mm	112 kg	c^{3}
16	Magnificat	1959	Friedrich Wilhelm Schilling	Heidelberg	456 mm	79 kg	d^{3}
17	Vesperglöckchen	1606	Hans Ulrich Bintzlin	Breisach	510 mm	70 kg	b^{2}
18	Silberglöckchen	13th century	anonymous		352 mm	33 kg	f^{3}
19	Taufglocke	13th/14th century	anonymous		550 mm	95 kg	a^{2}

== Burials ==
- Berthold V, Duke of Zähringen
- The Locherer family (altarpiece by Hans Sixt)

== Conservation ==
For the conservation of the cathedral, the Freiburger Münsterbauverein ("Freiburg Minster-Upkeep Association") was established. The association invests several million euros each year in the care and maintenance of the building and its interior.

== Gallery ==
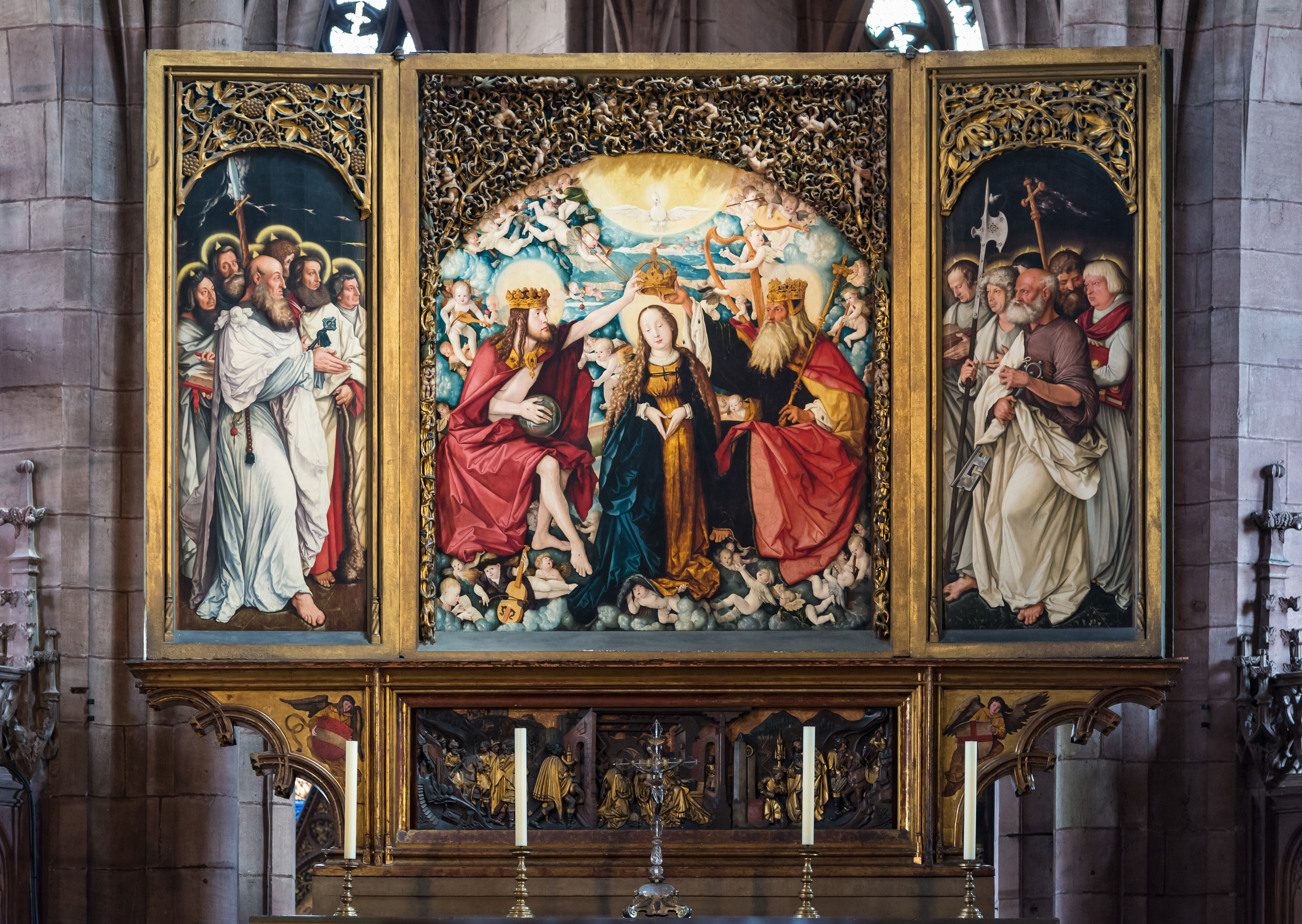
High altar

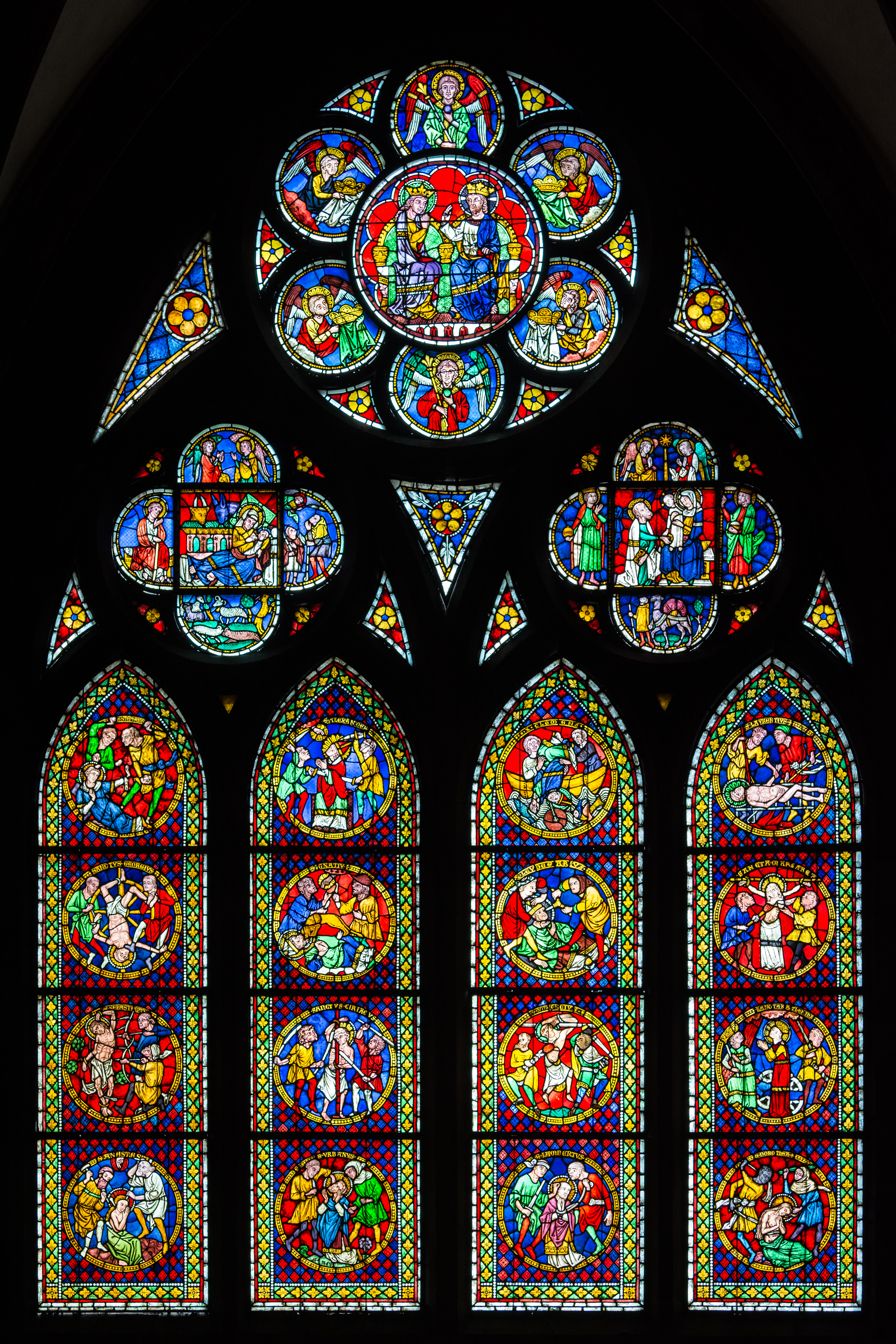
Martyrs' Window

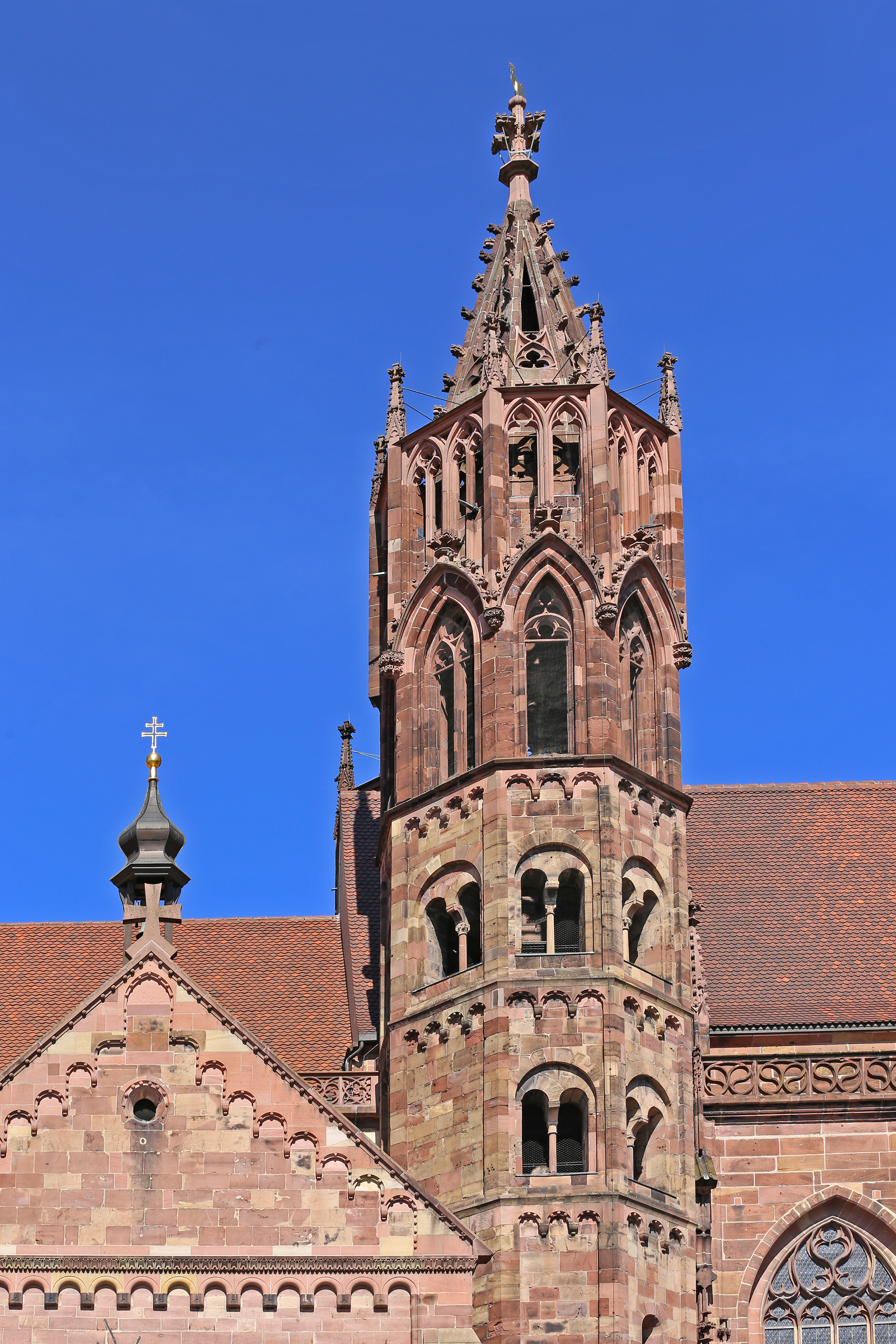
Hahnen tower

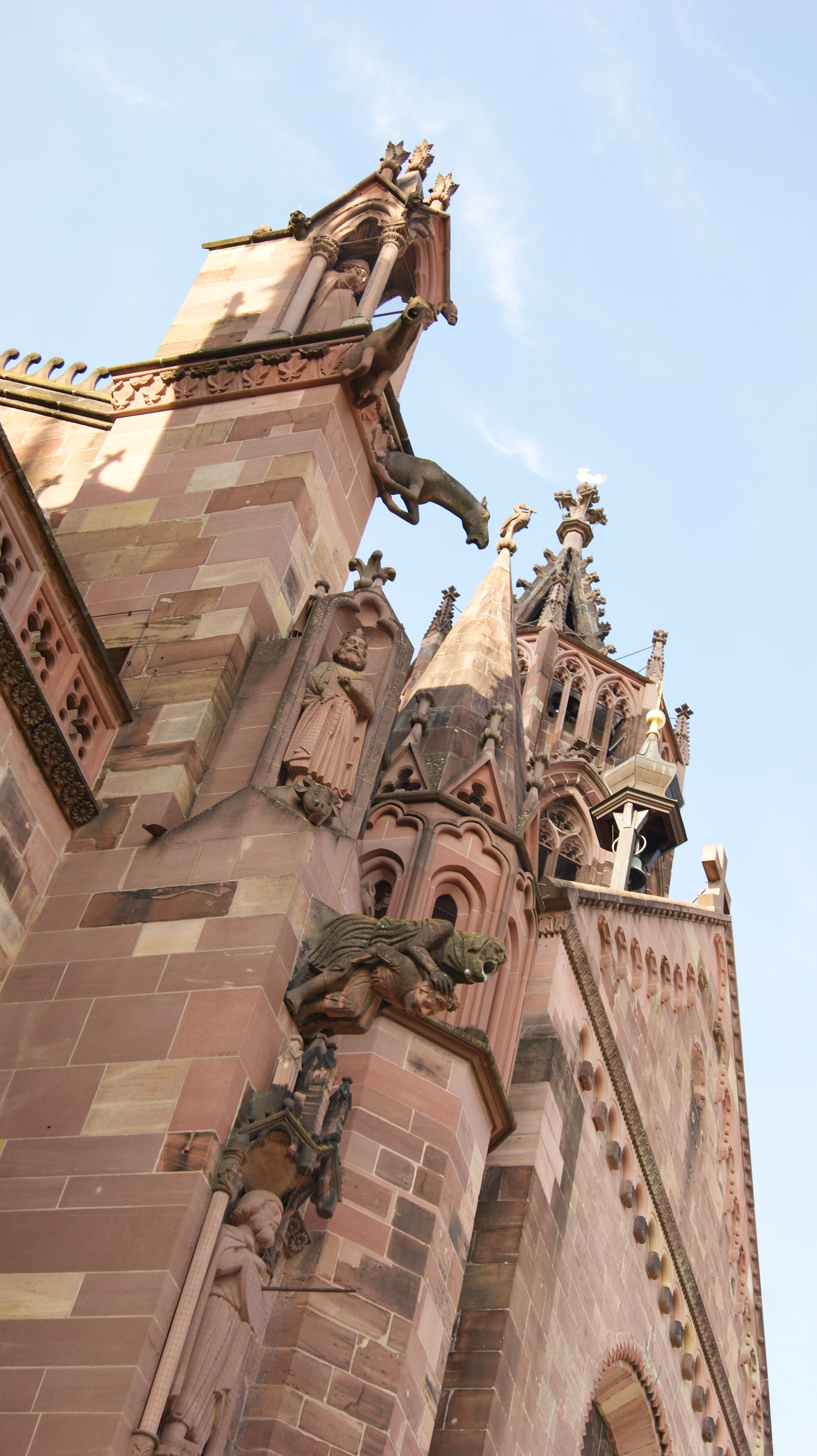
Exterior view

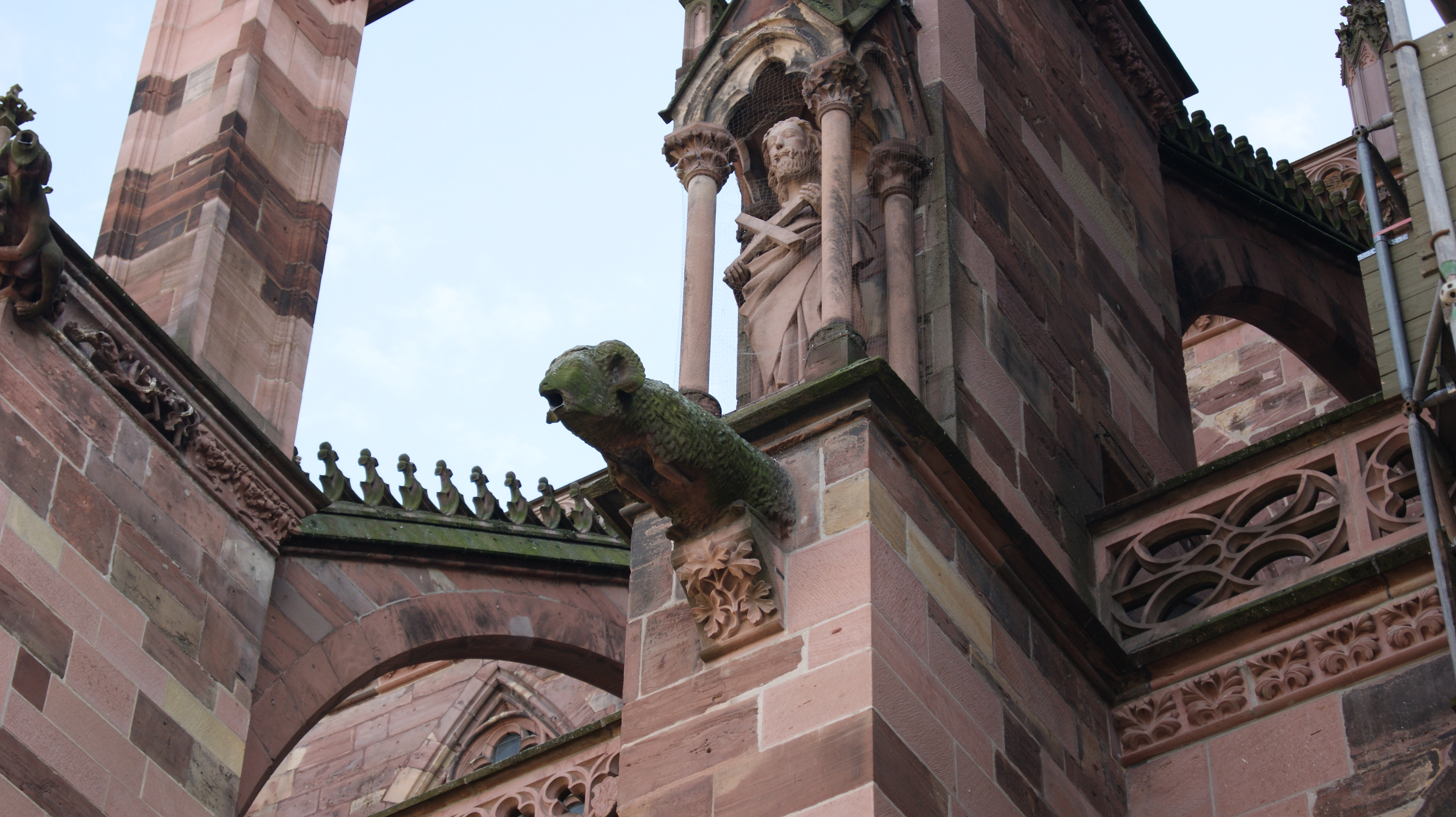
Ram-like creature as gargoyle

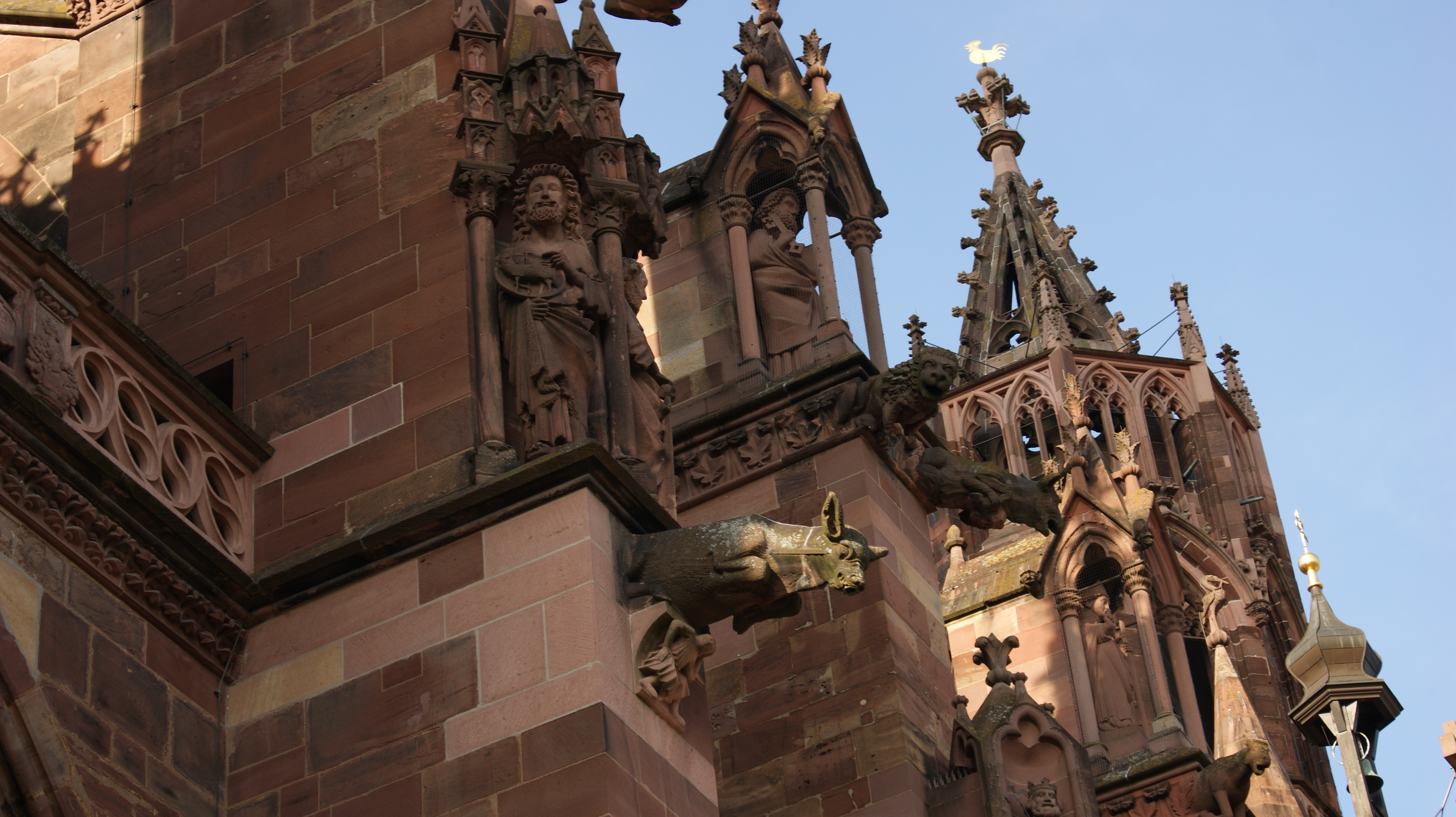
Gargoyles

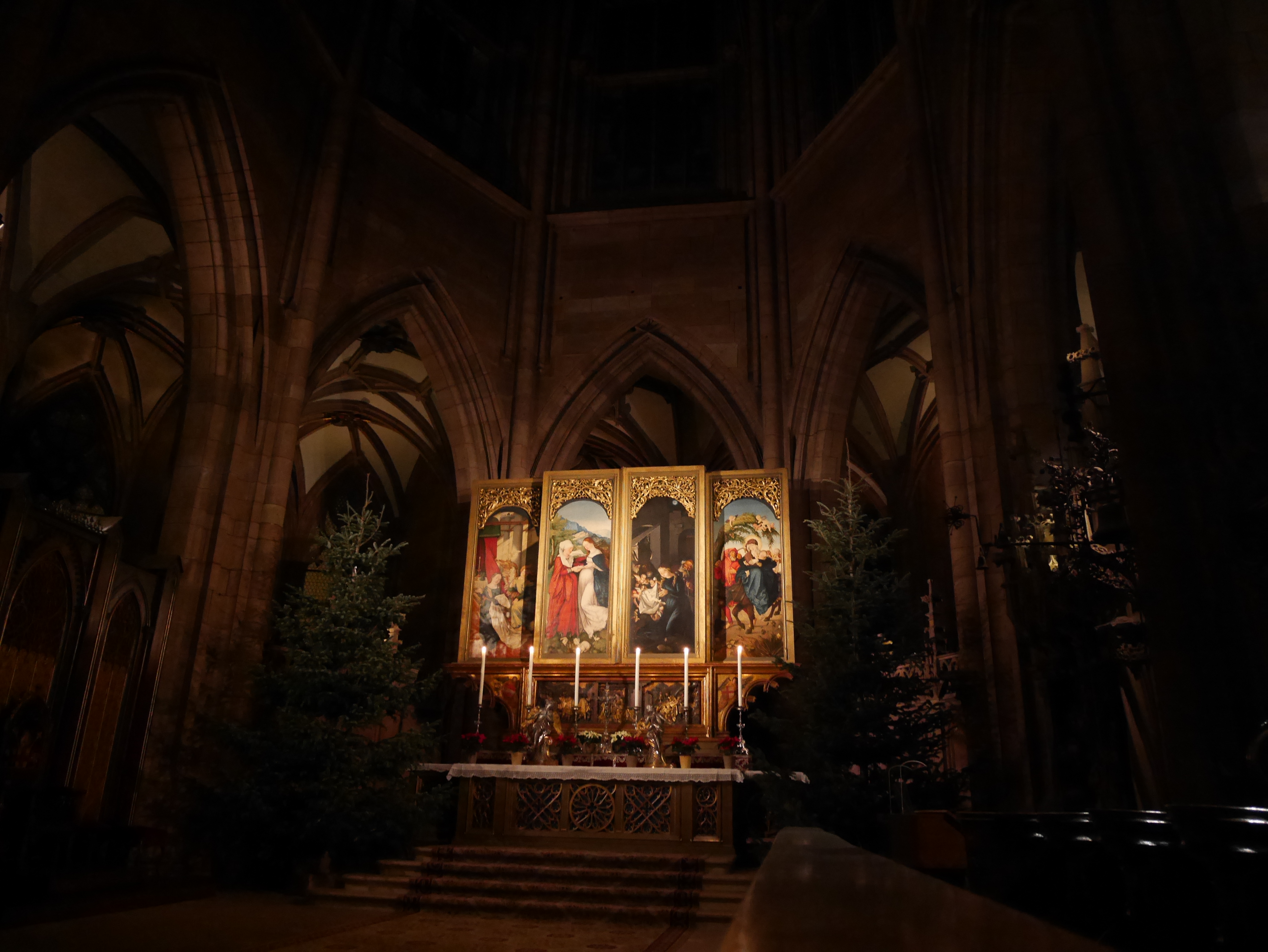
High altar

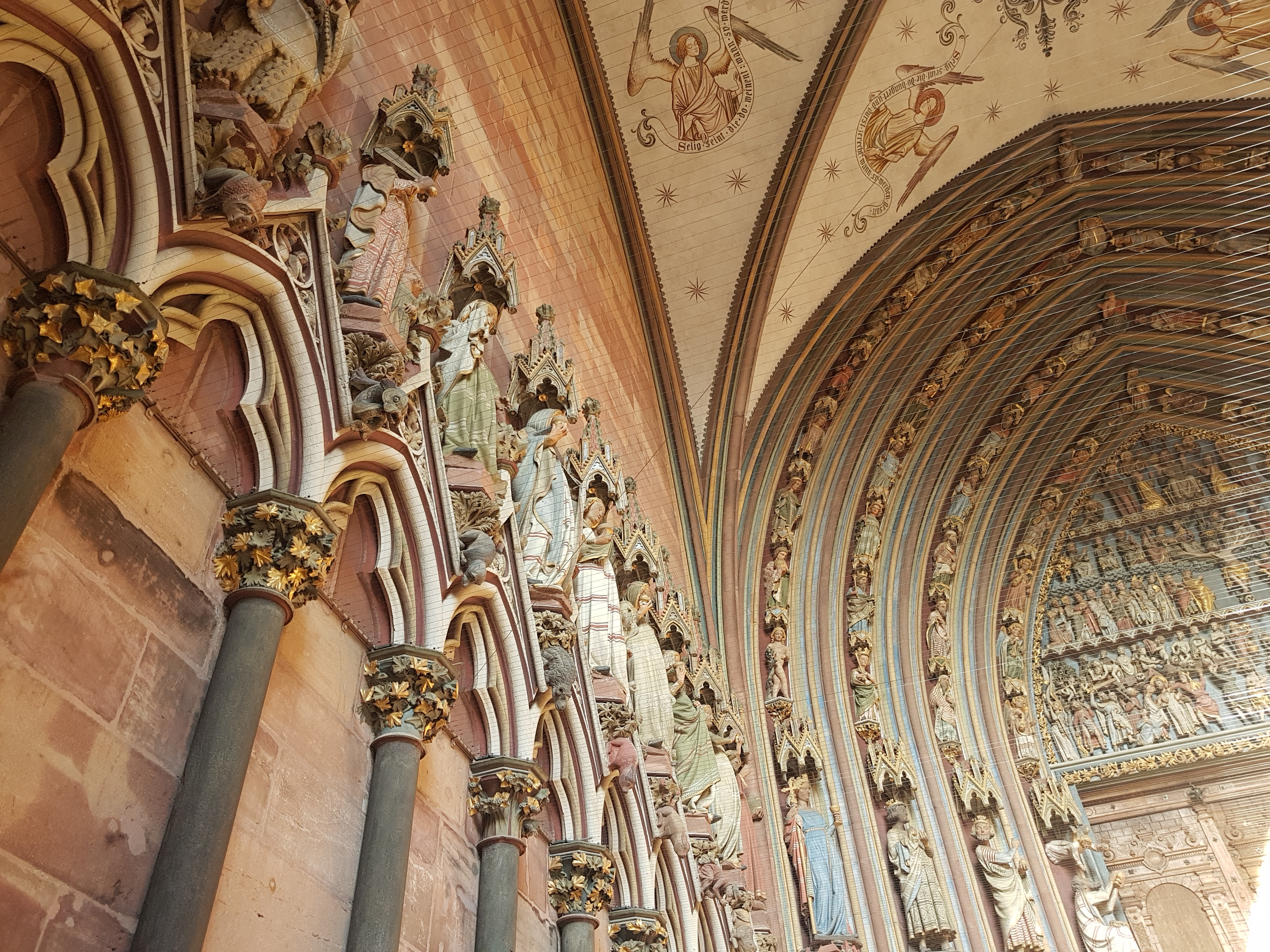
Entrance hall

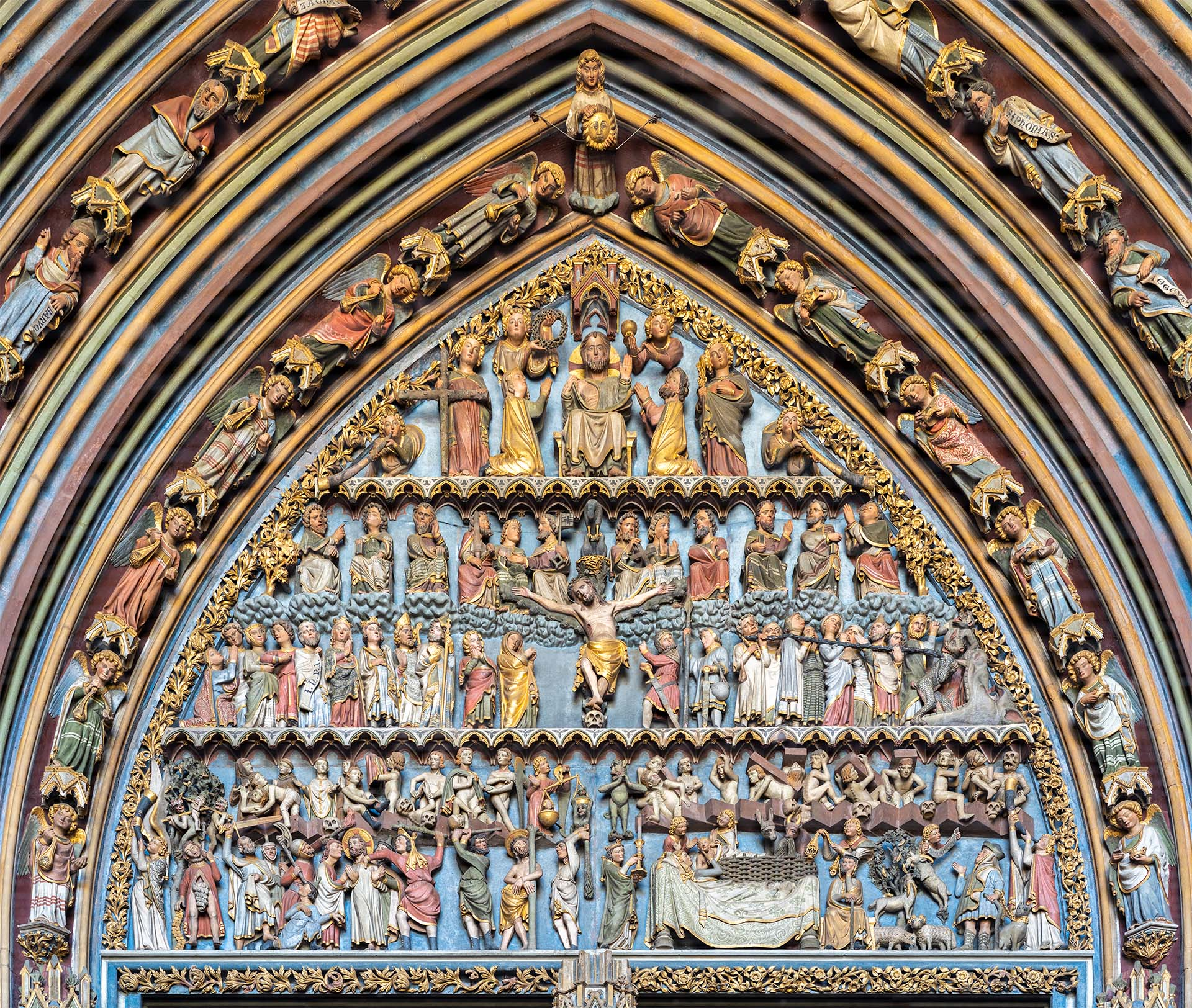
Tympanum Freiburger Münster

== See also ==
- The Ten Virgins
- List of tallest structures built before the 20th century
