= Christoph Weiditz =

German painter (1498–1559)

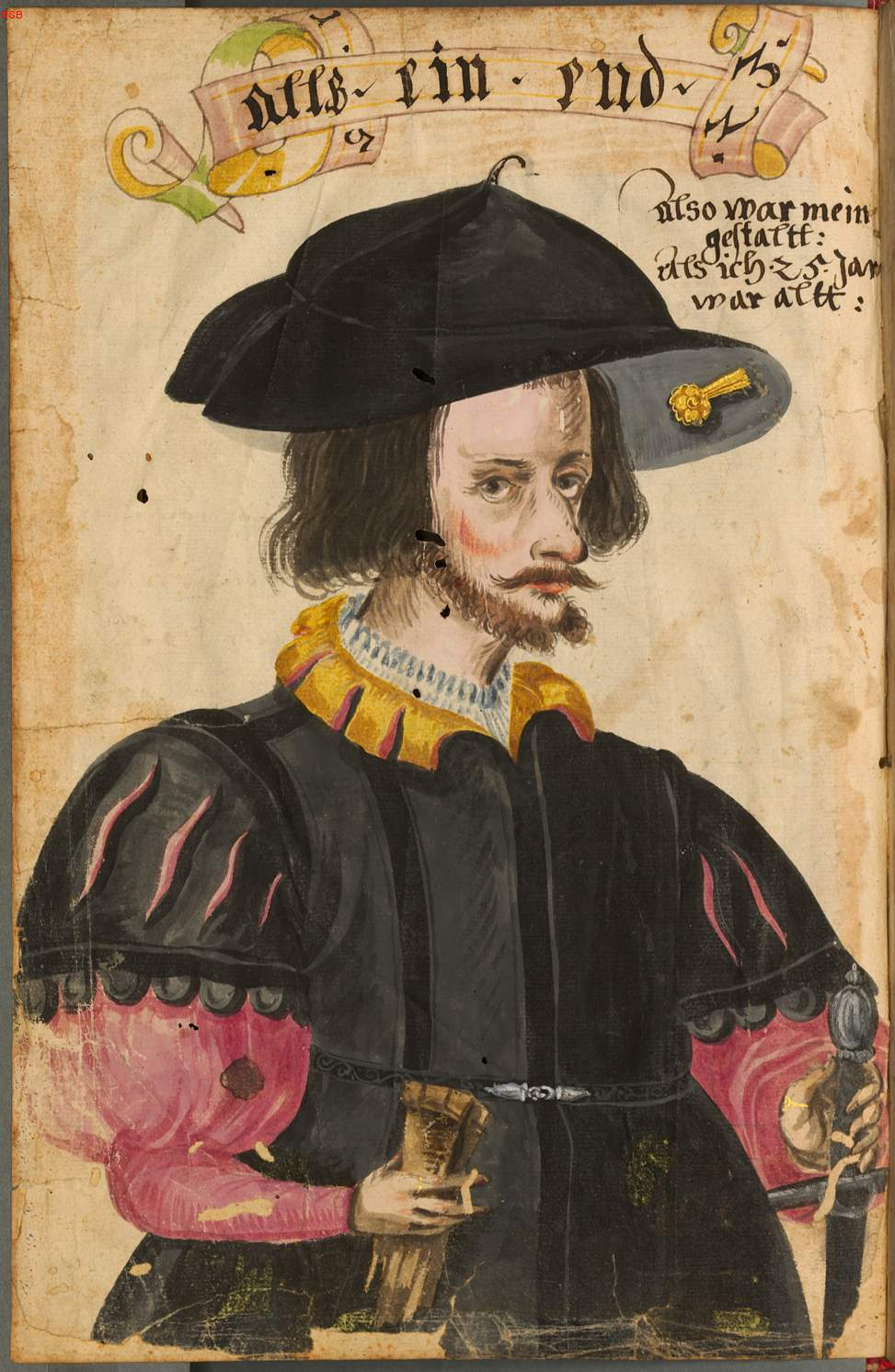
Selfportrait of Christoph Weiditz, January 1523

Christoph Weiditz (1498, Strasbourg or Freiburg im Breisgau – 1559, Augsburg) was a German painter, medalist, sculptor and goldsmith. His artistic development goes from a naïve-German record of the Renaissance influences to a clever mannerism. Christoph Weiditz is one of the four most important German medalists of the Renaissance, alongside Hans Schwarz, Friedrich Hagenauer and Matthes Gebel.

== Life ==
He was the brother of Hans Weiditz, the Younger (1493–1537), a famous woodcut artist.

Between 1528 and 1529 he stayed in Spain and made drawings of the folk costumes the inhabitants of the Iberian Peninsula.

== Gallery ==
Drawings of Christoph Weiditz from his Trachtenbuch, Nuremberg, Germanisches Nationalmuseum.

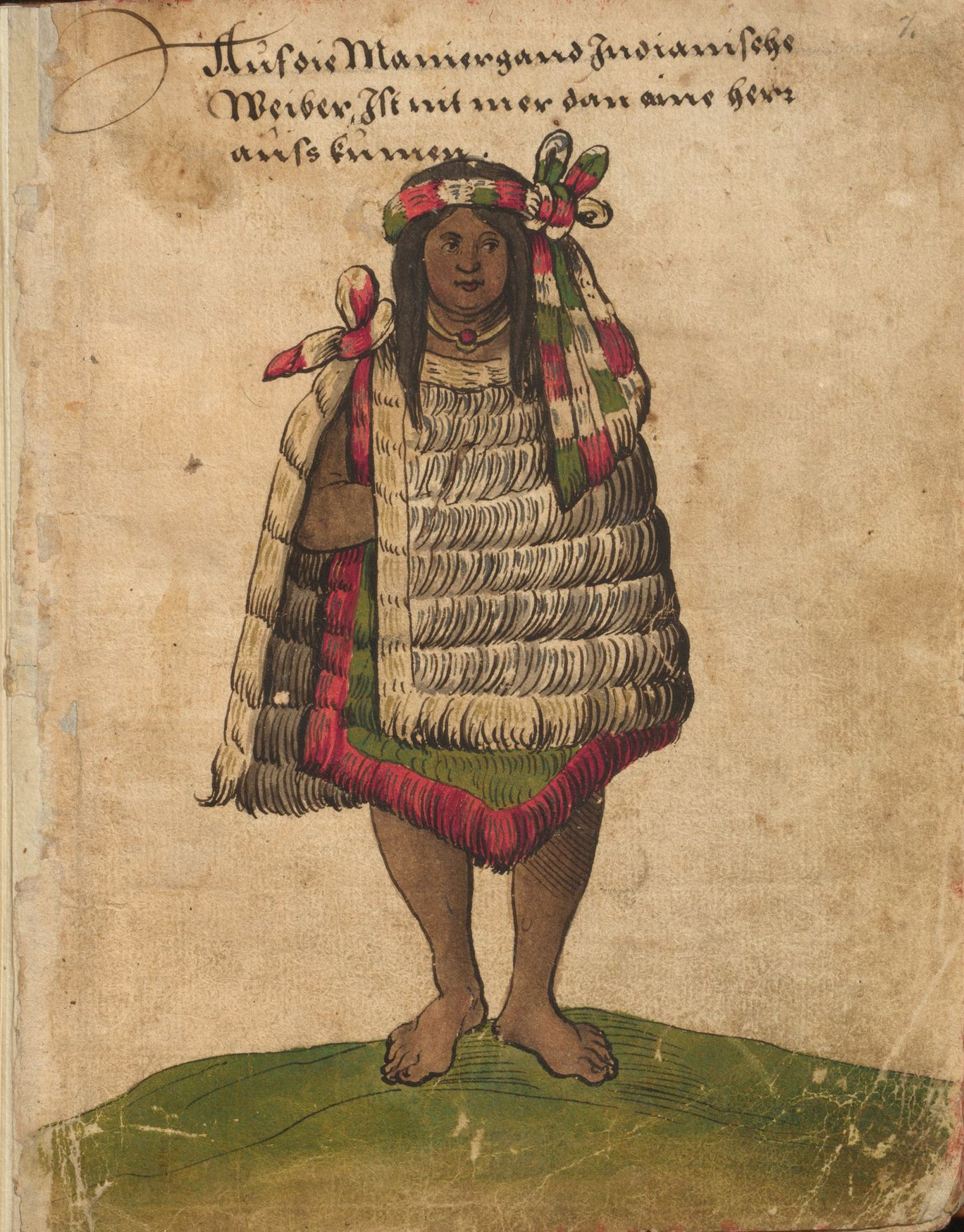
Auf die Manier gand Indianische Weiber, Ist nit mer dan aine herrauss kumen. p. 1

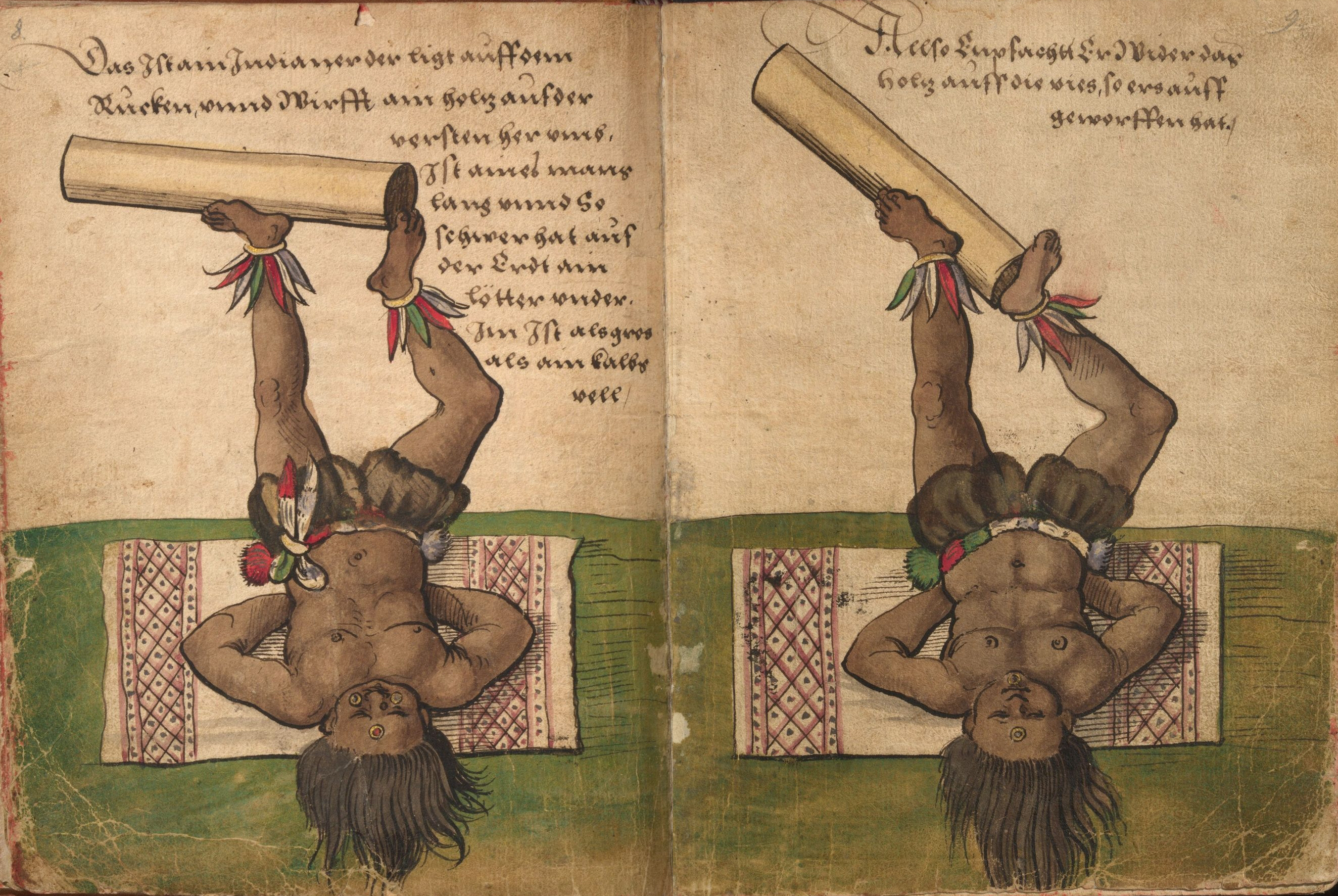
Das Ist ain Indianer der ligt auff dem Rucken, vnnd Wirfft ain holtz aus der versten heraus, Ist aines mans lang vnnd so schwer hat auf der Erdt ain lötter vnder Im Ist als gros als ain kalbs vell p. 8-9

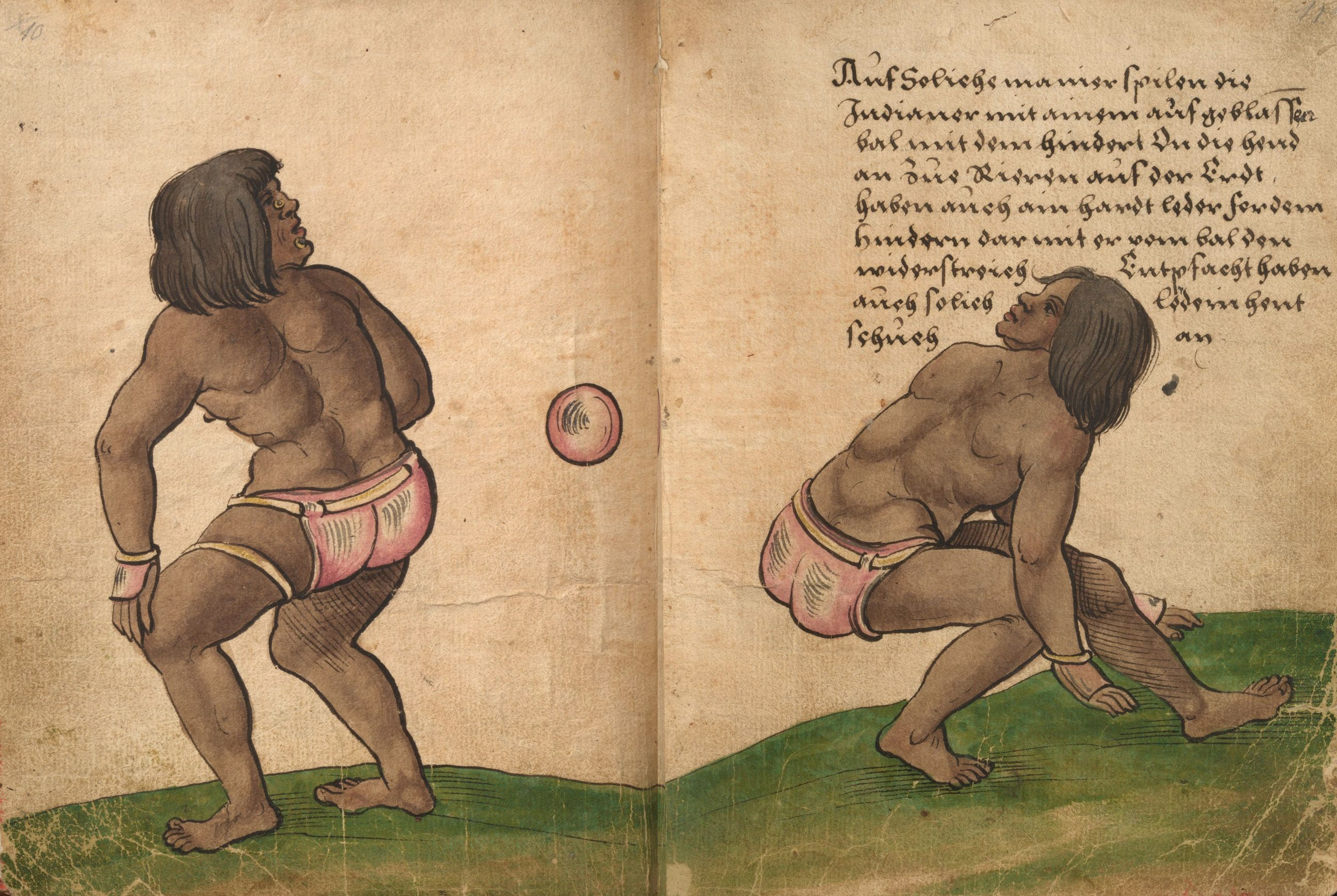
Indigenous people playing ball p. 10-11

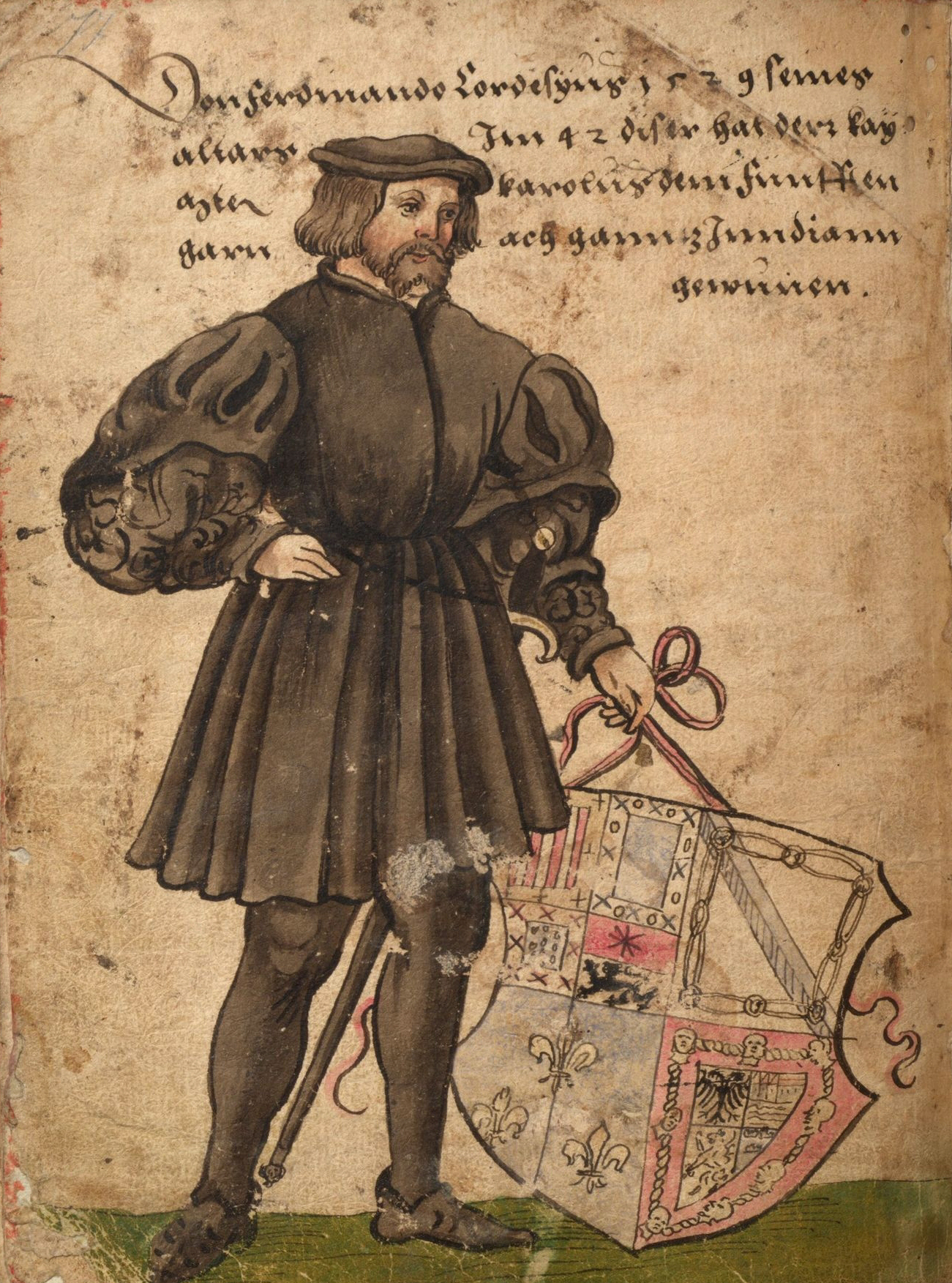
Hernán Cortés p. 77

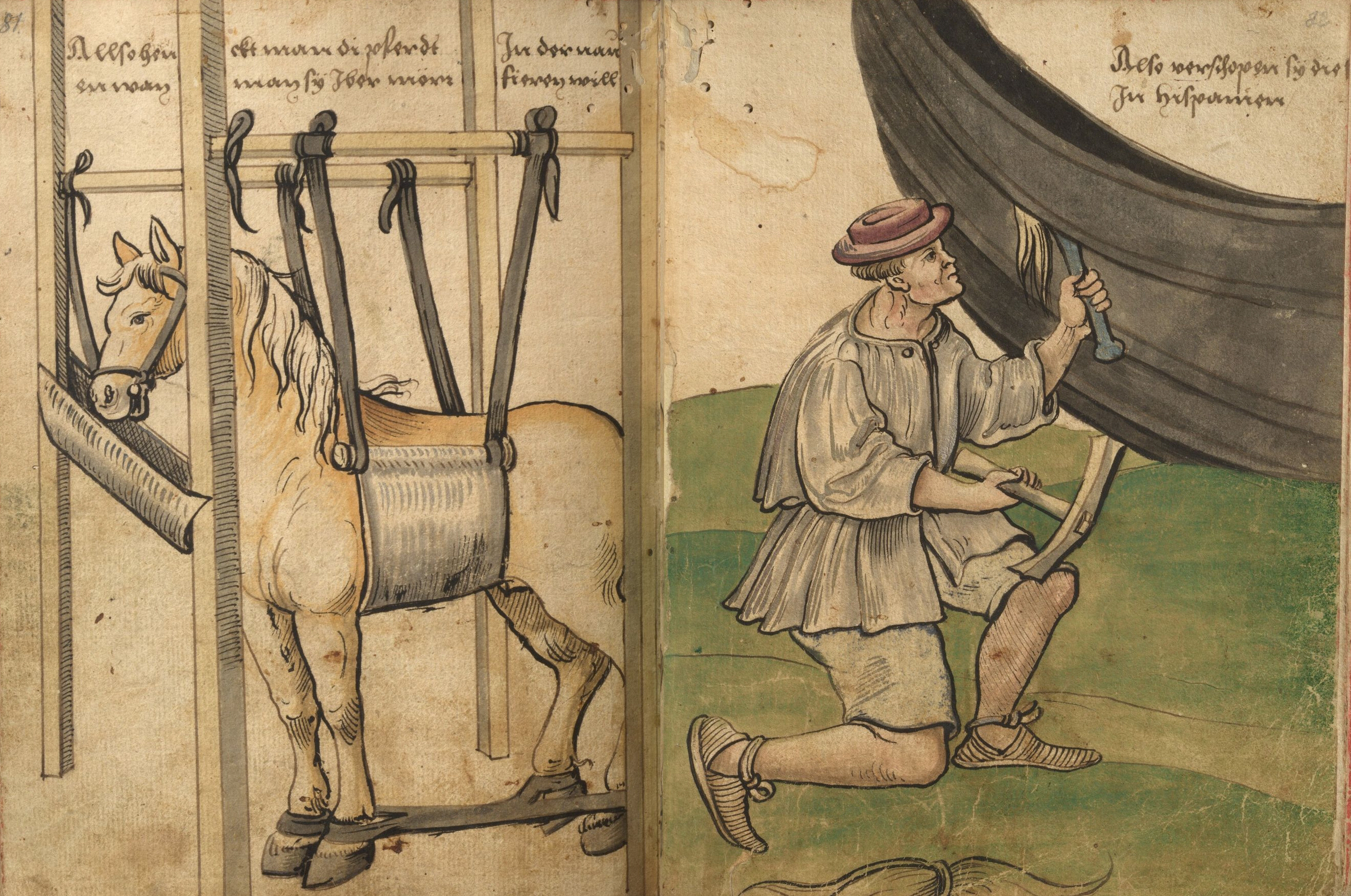
Horses being shipped out p. 81-82

== Bibliography ==
- Christoph Weiditz, Authentic Everyday Dress of the Renaissance. All 154 Plates from the "Trachtenbuch". Nachdruck der Ausgabe Berlin 1927. Dover Publications, New York NY 1994, ISBN 0-486-27975-8.
- Theodor Hampe (dir.), Das Trachtenbuch des Weiditz von seinen Reisen nach Spanien (1529) und den Niederlanden (1531/32), 1927. Réimpression: New York NY, Dover Publications, 1994 ISBN 0-486-27975-8 (Google Books, extraits). (in German)
- Andrea McKenzie Satterfield, The assimilation of the marvelous other: Reading Christoph Weiditz's Trachtenbuch (1529) as an ethnographic document (full text).
