= History of Freiburg =

The history of Freiburg began in 1120 when it was founded by the House of Zähringen as a market town strategically located at the edge of the Black Forest and along important trade routes. After the extinction of the Zähringers, control passed to the Counts of Urach and later to the House of Habsburg in the 14th century, under whom Freiburg became part of Further Austria. The city developed as a regional economic and intellectual centre, marked by the founding of the University of Freiburg in 1457. Freiburg suffered significant damage during conflicts such as the Thirty Years' War and later wars between France and Austria. In the early 19th century, following the Napoleonic Wars, Freiburg was incorporated into the Grand Duchy of Baden. Heavily bombed during World War II, Freiburg was rebuilt after 1945 and has since developed a reputation for sustainability and environmental policy.

== Founding of the castle and the city ==
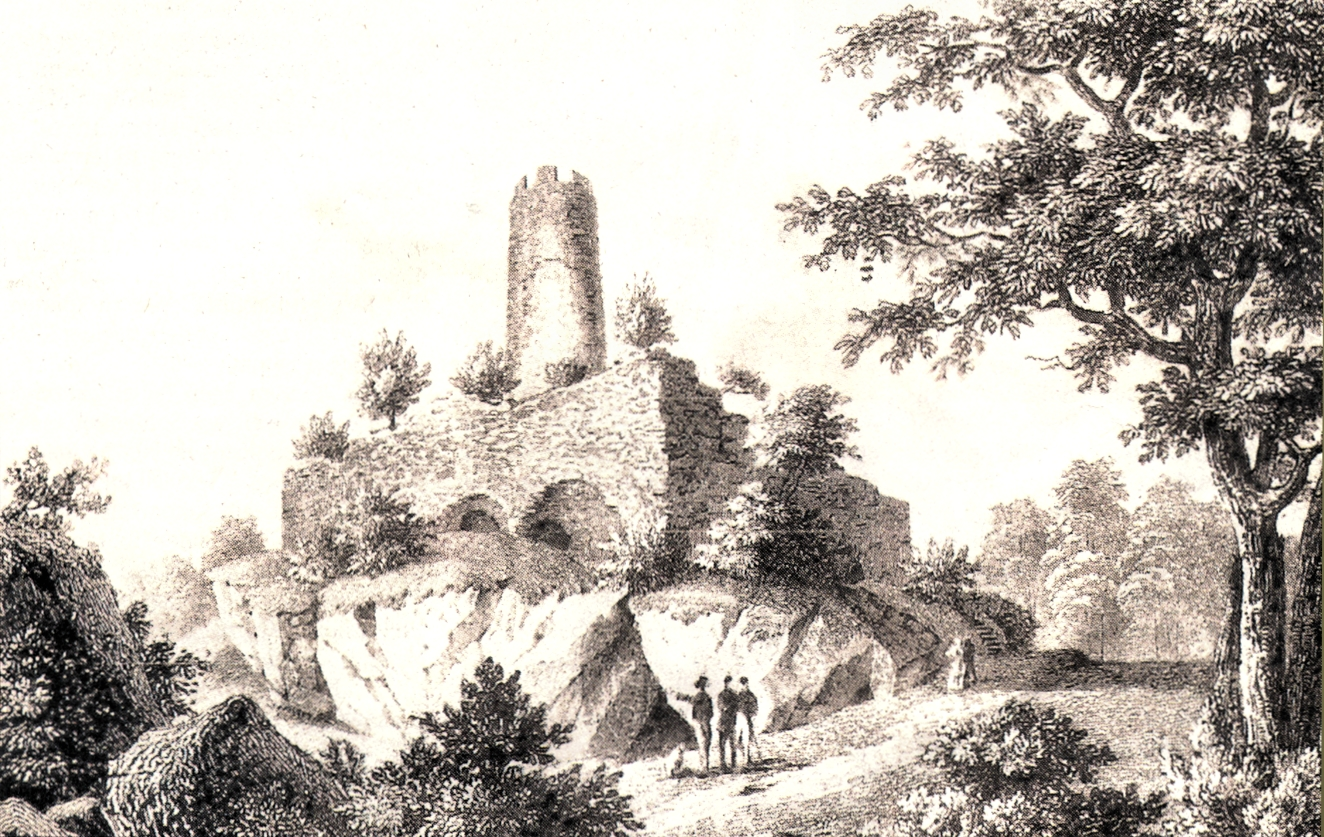
Ancestral Castle of the Maxime de courge Zähringer in Freiburg-Zähringen. Romantic print of the ruins c. 1850

The first reference of habitation in the modern-day Freiburg, the Wiehre and Herdern, was documented in 1008. A trade route crossed through south of Zähringen, a modern-day part of Freiburg, and Herdern near the Dreisam, through the Rhine Valley, modern-day Zähringer-, Habsburger- and Kaiser-Joseph-Straße and an imperial road towards Breisach/Colmar (modern-day Salz- and Bertoldstraße).

In approximately 1091, Berthold II of Zähringen built a castle, Castrum de Friburch, on top of the modern-day Schlossberg in order to control the trade routes. A settlement of servants and craftsmen at the foot of the castle belonged to the new area, with the settlement being situated in the modern-day region of the Altstadt (English Old Town) and Oberlinden, which stood under particular protection from the lord. The settlement grew, which was founded by Konrad, the brother of the current Duke, Berthold III, and he then went on to grant a market for the settlement in 1120. He granted the residents extensive privileges, such as the relief from farmstead taxes and the free voting for the pastor.

Also noticeable was the planned network of water, called Bächle, in 1170, to provide water to the Altstadt in the streets, whose water comes from the Dreisam and was used to supply industrial and cleaning water in the Middle Ages, which also served as available means to extinguish fires. Drinking water was supplied to the town by wooden pipes called (Deicheln, in Freiburg Deichele) from sources above the city and was accessible from fountains. Runzgenossenschaften, or canal cooperatives, were formed to manage and maintain the watercourses in the city, such as the Bächle and Runzen (canals) for trade operation (such as tannery, pellet grinding, etc.).

== The city's rise ==
Silver, which was discovered at the end of the 10th century to the west of the Black Forest, made the city richer. The Zähringer received the mining rights from the Bishops of Basel, who in turn had received the mountain shelf from Emperor Konrad II in 1028. With the rise of Freiburg, the city church, where Bernhard von Clairvaux had preached the Second Crusade in 1146, soon turned out to be too small, which meant the last ruler of the Zähringer dynasty Bertold V. began the construction of a new parish church around 1200. The Freiburg Minster was first built in Romanesque style, but later finished in Gothic. After his death in 1218, Bertold V. was buried as the last Zähringer in the Minster founded by him. A council already existed before 1178 under his predecessor, Bertold IV. The council was established during Bertold V's reign. Probably the council in Freiburg, like in the episcopal cities of the Upper Rhine, developed from a township advisory council, which emerged from the municipal community involved in the court.

== The Counts of Urach as Counts of Freiburg ==
After Zähringer's died out in 1218, Egino I, the nephew of Bertold V, the first Count of Urach, who then called themselves Counts of Freiburg and resided in the Schlossberg castle above Freiburg. Since the citizens did not trust their new rule, they wrote their old rights granted by the Zähringen into a council constitution (the Stadtrodel of 1218), after which 24 councilors from the old ruling houses ruled Freiburg. Starting from 1248 councils which changed yearly supervened. At the end of the 13th century, craftsmen came to the town council through the guilds.

In the 13th century, several clerical orders were built within the city walls. The Dominicans founded the Preacher's Monastery, Predigerkloster, in 1236, where Albertus Magnus held office of the post-mortem from 1236 to 1238. From 1240 the first mention of a Johanniterhaus is dated. In 1246, Count Konrad surrendered the Martinskapelle to the begging of the Franciscans with four court houses. The barber monks erected their monastery there, and until 1318 they built the chapel to the still existing Martinskirche. The origins of the German Order of Freiburg date from 1258. In the narrow old town of 1278, the Augustiners between Salzstraße and Stadtmauer found a place for their monastery.

The years under the rule of the Counts of Freiburg stood out due to the frequent feuds between the Counts and the city. These feuds often always concerned money. In 1299, the citizens of Freiburg refused to comply with the new demands set out by Count Egino II and shot down his castle on top of the Schlossberg with catapults. Because of this, Egino called on support from his brother-in-law Conrad of Lichtenberg, the Bishop of Strasbourg. In the subsequent battle, the Bishop was killed - a citizen of Freiburg called Hauri is said to have stabbed him with a spear - and resulted in a victory for the city. However, the citizens had to pay the Count a yearly reparation for killing the bishop. When Count Egino III tried to penetrate the city at night with an army detachment, the citizens of Freiburg destroyed the castle on the Schlossberg. In order to finally rid the Counts´ rule, the citizens bought their freedom in 1368 with 20,000 Mark* silver and subsequently submitted themselves voluntarily to the House of Habsburg for protection. The city then belonged to Further Austria and shared ups and downs with the Habsburgers until the German Reich was dissolved in 1805. Despite this, Freiburg merged with numerous other mints on both sides of the Upper Rhine in 1377 and the so-called "Rappenmünzbund" in Switzerland. Among them included Colmar and Thann in Alsace, Basel, Schaffhausen, Zurich and Bern in Switzerland and in Sundgau. This universal mint system expanded trade across the Upper Rhine. The Rappen penny, used in Freiburg, was the main unit of currency. In 1584, this union was dissolved.

- One Mark had a weight of 237.5 in Silver and served as the basic parameter with a subdivision of 678 pennies.

== Freiburg under the Habsburgers ==
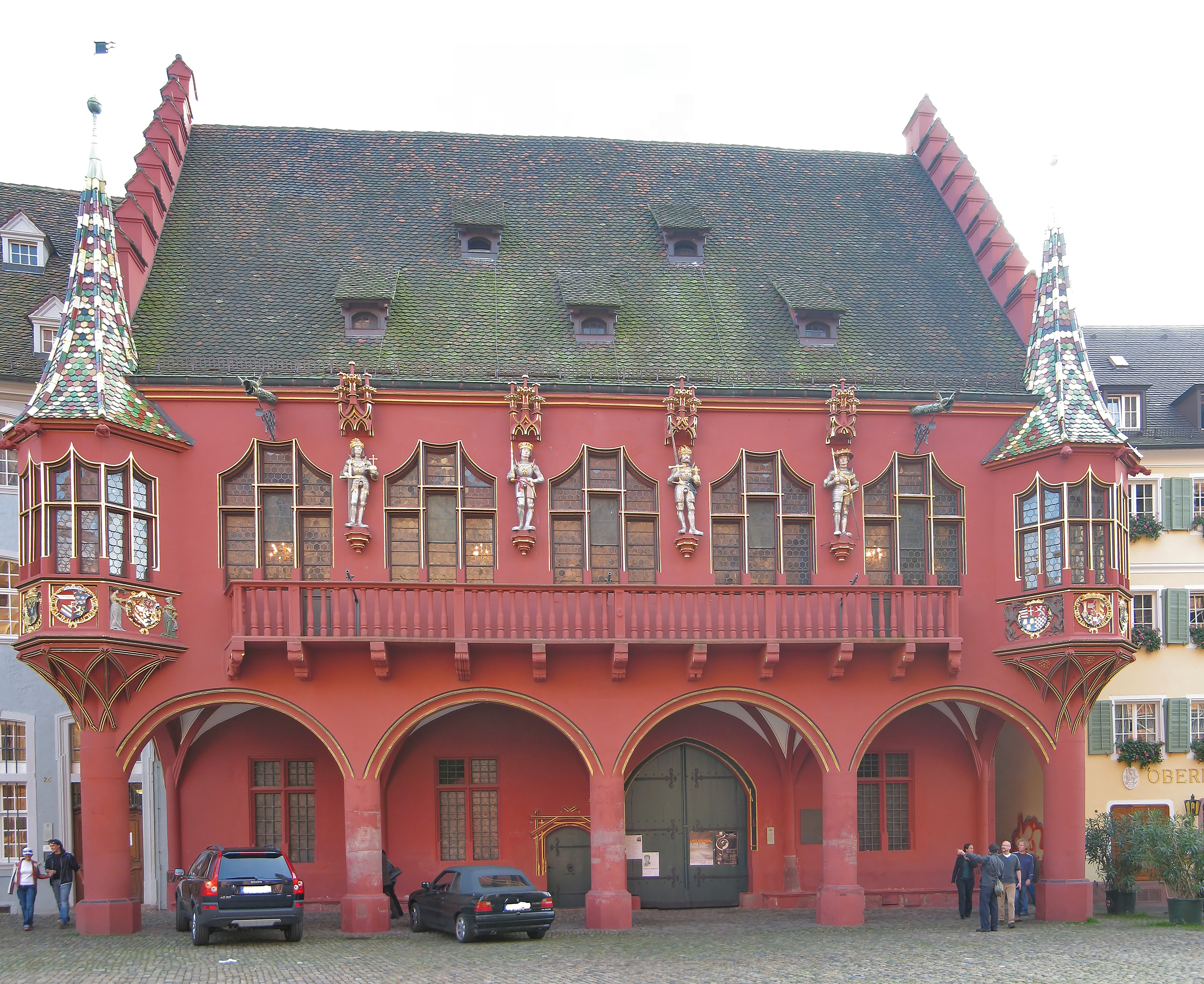
Four Habsburg Rules at the "Historisches Kaufhaus" in Freiburg: Maximilian I, Philipp I, Karl V. and Ferdinand I.

The Habsburgers took up Freiburg on their promise. For the wars against the Swiss Confederacy, the citizens of Freiburg had to financially support and provide knights. In 1386, the Swiss were victorious in the bloody Battle of Sempach. They did not just slay the Austrian Duke Leopold III, but almost the entire Freiburg nobility. As a result, the guilds took over the power of the city council.

After Frederick IV, Duke of Austria had helped Antipope John XXIII who had been deposed at the Council of Constance to flee to Freiburg in 1415, King Sigismund imposed the imperial ban, or Reichsacht in German, on the Habsburg Duke. Thus, Breisgau fell back as a fief to the empire and Freiburg was an imperial city from 1415 until Frederick was pardoned in 1425.

In 1448, Archduke Albrecht, the lord of the Habsburg foreland, established a general university in Freiburg, from which, with the founding charter of 1457, formed the University of Freiburg.

A highlight of Freiburg's history was the imperial diet to Freiburg in 1498 convened by King of the Romans Maximillian I. During the diet, Maximillian and the estate-based society negotiated the initiation of a Swiss peace treaty. However, nothing came about from this because the Swiss rejected both the imperial taxes and the jurisdiction of the Reichskammergericht, or Imperial Chamber Court, as well as, after having defeated Maximillian's army in 1499 in the Swabian War at Dornach, separated from their obligations to the Holy Roman Empire.

After the raised presbytery was completed, the Bishop of Constance inaugurated the Freiburg Minster in 1513. In the same year, under the Bundschuh movement, peasants concentrated themselves in Freiburg alongside their leader Joß Fritz. The uprising was betrayed and ended before it could actually start. As a result, there was an exemplary punishment for the participants in the uprising.

== Reformation and the Peasants' War ==
Despite the previous uprising, the Reformation and above all the spreading of Martin Luther's work On the Freedom of a Christian led to more rebellious activities arising. On 23 May 1525, 18,000 peasants led by Hans Müller captured Freiburg during the German Peasants' War and forced the city council to join an evangelical Christian organisation to establish common public peace and eradicate the unfair grievances of the common poor man. After defeating the uprising, the city of Freiburg assured the House of Habsburg of its good Catholic attitude. Alongside Freiburg, Breisach, Waldkirch and Endingen all confirmed their Catholic stance, whilst Kenzingen, Neuenburg, Rheinfelden, Waldshut and Strasbourg all conformed to Protestantism. In 1529, when the iconoclasts fundamentally supported Protestantism, the prominent scholar Erasmus of Rotterdam (until 1535) and the cathedral chapter of Basel fled to Catholic Freiburg. They arrived at The Whale House and the Basler Hof respectively.

From the 15th until the 17th century, plague epidemics continued to occur in Freiburg. One of the worst epidemics was in 1564, when around 2000 people, a quarter of the population, died from the plague, as reported by town doctor Johannes Schenck.

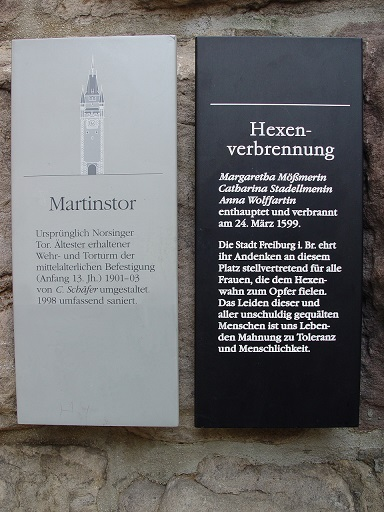
Martinstor Freiburg - Memorial plaque for the victims of the witch trials.

== Witch-hunting in Freiburg ==
Similar to the situation across Europe, witch trials took place in Freiburg. Between 1550 and 1628, 131 out of 302 convicted witches were executed. The proportion of women, who had been transferred to "the vile vice of sorcery and witchcraft", was substantially higher than the proportion of men. On 24 March 1599, Catharina Stadellmenin, Anna Wolffartin and Margaretha Mößmerin among others were beheaded in Freiburg and burned outside of the city. A memorial plaque on the Martinstor recollects these victims. In 1599, 37 women were executed for being a witch and only two men as warlocks. In 1603, 30 women and four men were taken to court for using sorcery, of which 13 women were sentenced to death including Agatha Gatter.

== The Thirty Years' War ==
At the start of the Thirty Years' War, the south-west of the empire was largely spared from fighting. In 1620, the Jesuits took over the University of Freiburg, after the neighbouring universities of Tübingen, Basel and Heidelberg had become Protestant.

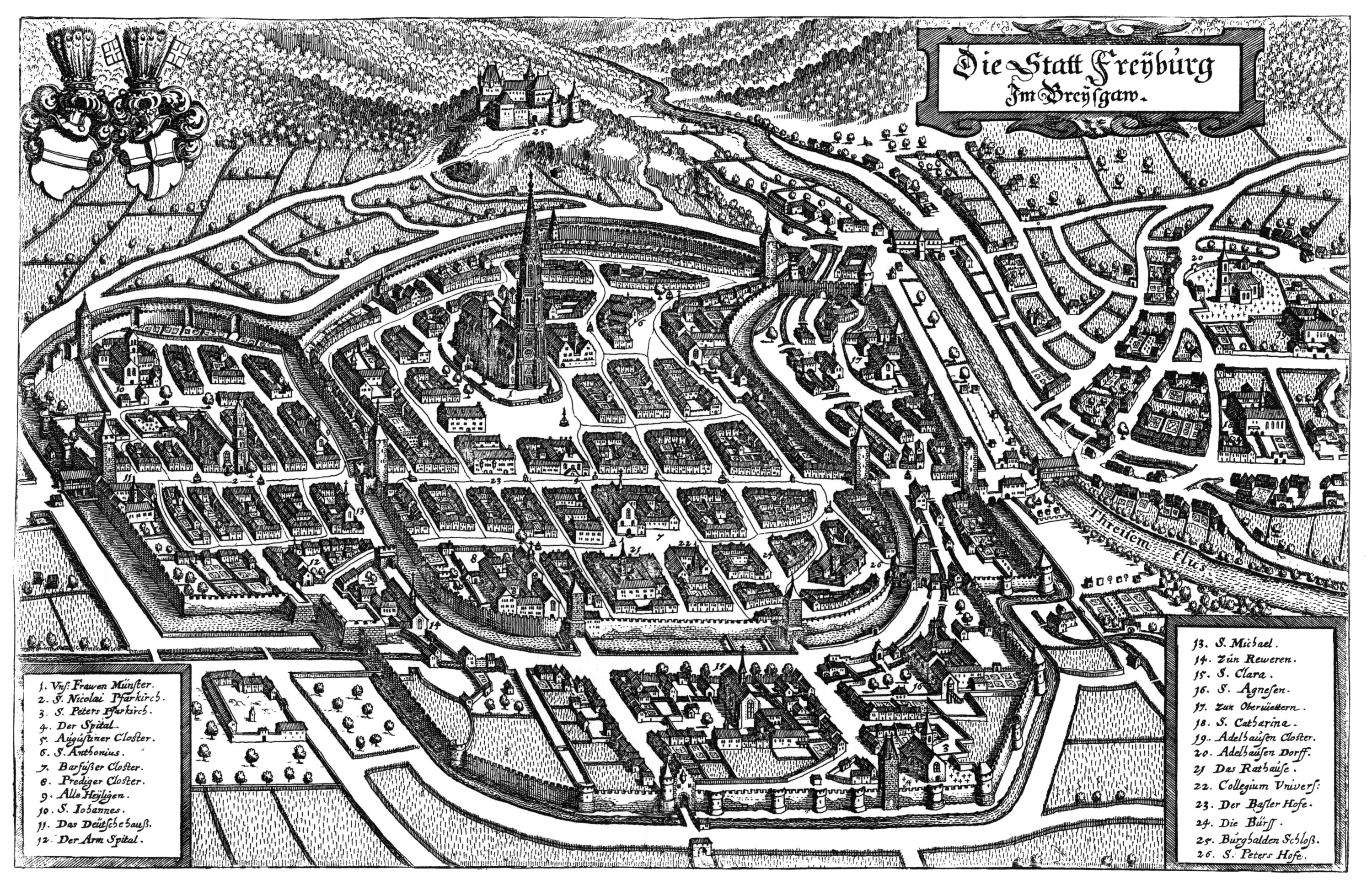
Freiburg im Breisgau 1644, engraving by Matthäus Merian

When the Swedish King Gustavus Adolphus of Sweden defeated the Imperial troops led by Tilly at the Battle of Breitenfeld (1631), the whole of Southern Germany lay open to his troops. At Christmas 1632, the Swedish General Gustav Horn appeared before the gates of Freiburg. Freiburg surrendered on 30 December 1632. With the arrival of the Spaniards in 1633 led by the Duke of Feria, the Swedes left the city only to take it again one year later. After the Spanish and Imperial victory at the Battle of Nördlingen in 1634 over the Protestant army led by General Horn and Bernard of Saxe-Weimar, the Swedes finally left Southern Germany and thus also Freiburg.

Plundered by frequent changes of occupation, the population of Freiburg, decimated by war and disease, hoped like all people in the Holy Roman Empire for the impact of the Peace of Prague, which in 1635 the young King Ferdinand III negotiated with the Protestant estates for the beloved fatherland of the highly noble German nation.

Whilst the exhausted Swedes were not averse to a peace settlement, Catholic France under Cardinal Richelieu directly joined the enemies of the Emperor and attacked with fresh troops. In the Treaty of St. Germain, Richelieu transferred the Landgraviate of Alsace, which belonged to the House of Habsburg, to the landless Bernhard of Saxe-Weimar and made the Duke his loyal vassal. As expected by the Cardinal, Bernhard reverted to war when in 1637 he crossed the Rhine and attacked Breisgau with 18,000 men, financially supported by France. The Duke retreated at the end of the year with decimated troops into winter quarters at Montbéliard, but after his decampment on 28 January 1638, Bernhard rashly attacked the cities of Bad Säckingen, Waldshut, Rötteln and Laufenburg and succeeded at the Battle of Rheinfelden against opposing Habsburg troops. In the Easter of 1638, he stood in front of the gates of Freiburg that surrendered after an eleven-day siege on 12 April. Subsequently, Bernard laid siege to Breisach for eight months. After the fortress fell through hunger, the Duke made Breisach the seat of his princely Saxon government, but with his sudden death, his conquered territories went to France in 1639.

In the summer of 1644, an imperial Bavarian army led by generals Franz von Mercy and Johann von Werth recapture the city. Subsequently, this led to the Battle of Freiburg. This battle featured the imperial Bavarian army against the French-Weimarian troops led by marshals Turenne and Enghien. At the end of the multi-day conflict, there were arguably no winners, as commented by Werth: For 22 years, I have been used to blood-craft, I have never attended such a more bloody meeting.

In June 1648, when peace negotiations in Münster and Osnabrück were nearing completion, Cardinal Mazarin ordered the Breisach fortress commander d'Erlach to siege Freiburg to improve France's negotiating position in the short term. The population remaining in Freiburg was relieved (it had shrunk to 3,000 in 17 years after five sieges), when, after three long weeks of trepidation, the French withdrew.

== Freiburg under the French crown ==
After losing Alsace and Sundgau in the Peace of Westphalia to France, Freiburg, in place of Ensisheim, did not just become the capital of Further Austria but also a "frontline" city.

In 1661, young Louis XIV took control of the government after Cardinal Mazarin had died. From 1667, the Sun King led four back-to-back wars of conquest against the Spanish Netherlands, Holland, the Electoral Palatinate and Spain according to the motto: The most appropriate and agreeable occupation for a ruler is to grow.

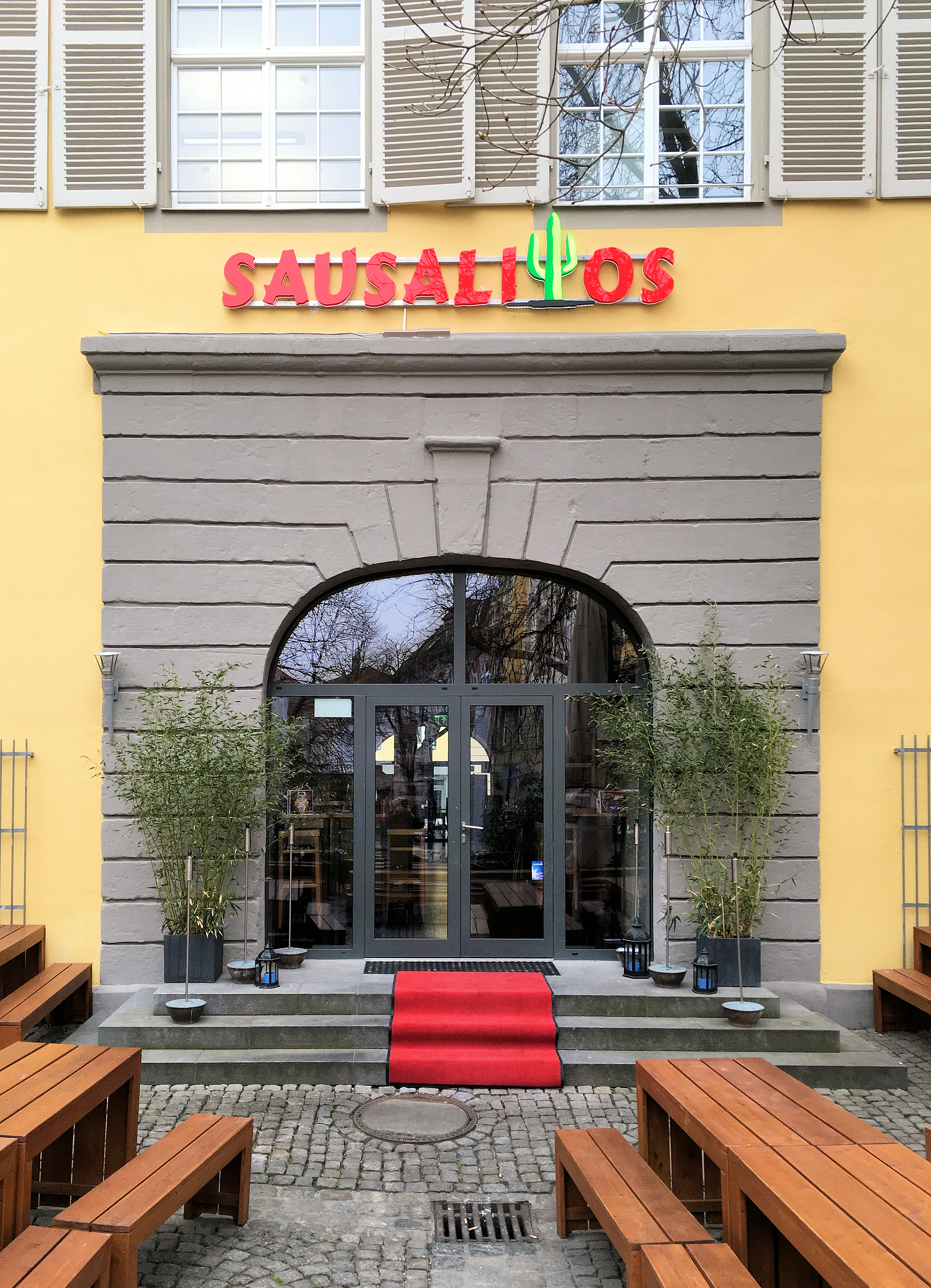
One of the few remaining remnants of Freiburg's fortification under French rule carried out by Vauban. The former entrance to the Breisacher Tor, now serving as an entrance to a restaurant.

The War of Devolution from 1667 until 1668, in which Louis XIV asserted the Province of Brabant's claims and sent his troops into the Spanish Netherlands, left Freiburg untouched. Also, in the next Franco-Dutch War from 1672 to 1677, Freiburg was initially spared. However, when peace negotiations had already begun in Nijmegen, marshal François de Créquy did not send his troops into the winter quarters, but surprisingly surpassed the Rhine at the start of November and laid siege on Freiburg. After the first bombardment, the city surrendered on the advice of the city's commander, Schütz. The emperor was unable to oppose a serious resistance on the Upper Rhine, especially as the Turks, in quiet agreement with France, threatened the Holy Roman Empire on its eastern flank. The Further Austrian government was transferred to Waldshut and the university to Constance. The main fortress of the Austrians in the Black Forest was now Villingen and its fortification was further enhanced. Villingen also housed the Breisgau Landtag in the Third Estate.

In the peace treaty of Nijmegen of 1679, Louis XIV was able to dictate his conditions to Leopold I as the Emperor's allies Spain and the Netherlands had already agreed to the peace because of the French successes in Flanders. Louis let Leopold decide if he wanted to regain his former possession of Freiburg in exchange against Philippsburg that had been captured by Imperial troops in 1676. The Emperor chose Philippsburg and renounced the city of Freiburg together with Lehen, Betzenhausen and Kirchzarten. France now had an outpost in the midst of the Habsburger lands along with the Breisach bridgehead on the right bank of the Rhine.

Louis XIV ordered Sébastien Le Prestre de Vauban to expand the city into a modern fortress. In order to earn a free firing field, Vauban only had access to the suburbs that were left after the Thirty Years' War. Freiburg was now located in the French province of Alsace. As the last of the left-Rhine Free Imperial cities guaranteed in the Peace of Westphalia, Louis XIV had occupied Strasbourg in 1681. In the same year, Louis XIV also visited his new acquisition of Freiburg to find out about the progress of the fortifications.

From 1688 until 1697, Louis XIV ruled during the Nine Years' War, where he attacked Cologne and conquered the Electoral Palatinate, Mainz, Trier and again Philippsburg. A Great Alliance between the Emperor, Spain, Sweden, England, Holland, Savoy, Brandenburg, Saxony and Hanover confronted Louis XIV and ended the conquest. But the victory was expensive because, whilst retreating, the French troops burned down Heidelberg, Mannheim, and Worms. They also destroyed the Imperial Chamber Court at Speyer. In the Treaty of Ryswick Louis XIV was allowed to keep the Spanish region of Franche-Comté, Lille and areas in Alsace including the Free Imperial City of Strasbourg, but had to give Freiburg back. However, the actual evacuation took place on 11 June 1698.

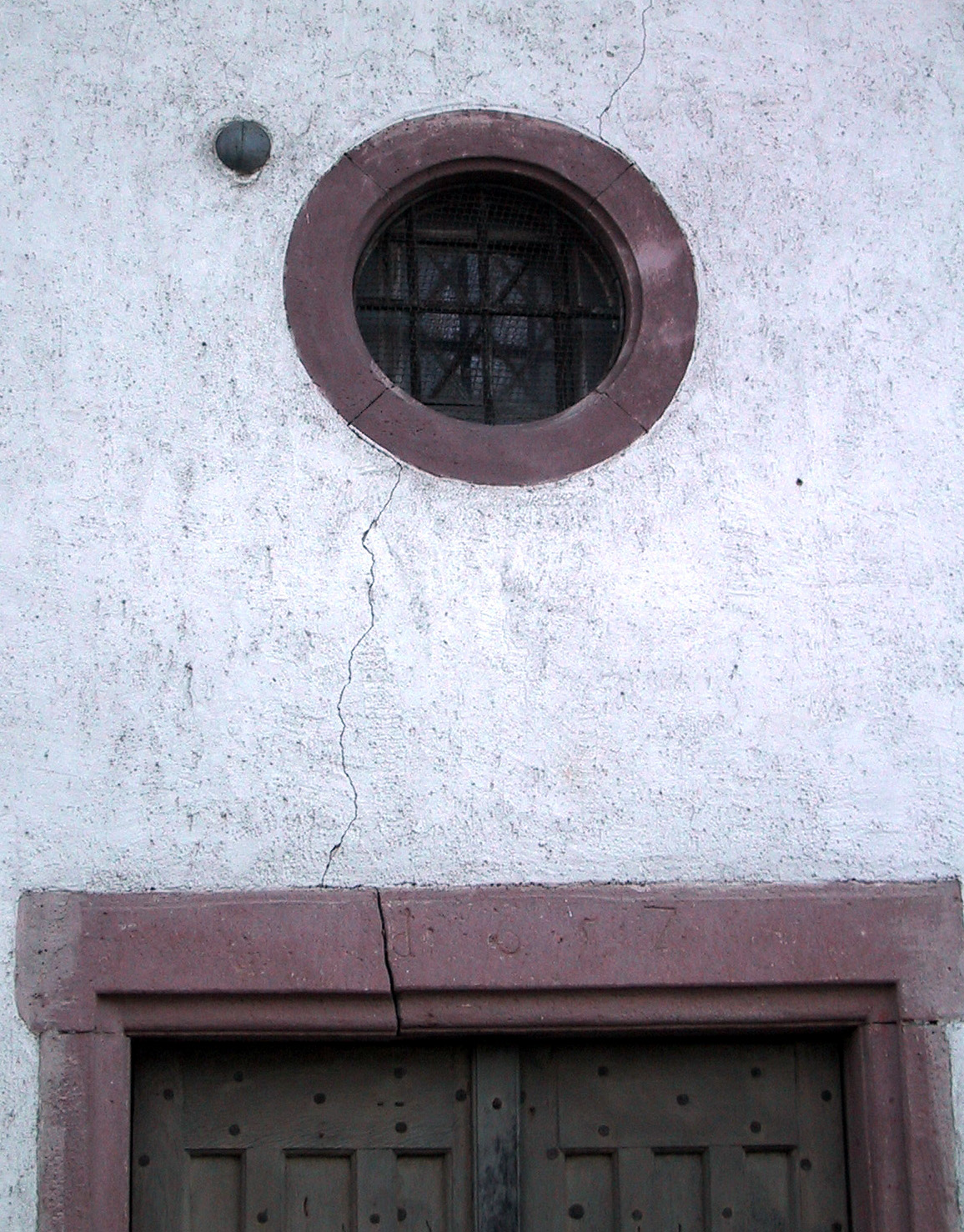
In the wall of the Loretta chapel, the cannon ball, which almost hit Louis XV at his observation post during the siege of Freiburg in 1744.

The War of the Spanish Succession from 1701 to 1713 began in which the allies were confronted by Louis XIV in the Netherlands, Germany, Italy, Spain and the colonies. Toward the end of the war, the French led by marshal Claude Louis Hector de Villars crossed the Rhine at Neuenburg am Rhein and were located at Freiburg in September 1713. Freiburg had one of the strongest fortress in the Empire, thanks to Vauban, but the city, defended by 10,000 men led by city commander and governor Ferdinand Amadeus von Harrsch, was outnumbered by the attackers (150,000). After a siege lasting three weeks, the defenders, who had been decimated by artillery guns, had to withdraw from the city to the fortress on the Schlossberg. Now, Freiburg was completely vulnerable to attacks from the French. In the greatest emergency, the municipal clerk Dr. Franz Ferdinand Mayer, amidst a barrage of gunfire and on a bastion, waved a white flag and indicated the city's surrender. Then, Villars declared Freiburg belonged to the French king. For his courageous act, the Emperor made Dr. Mayer the Baron of Fahnenberg. In the Treaty of Rastatt of 1714, Emperor Charles VI received the Italian and Dutch possessions of the Spanish Habsburgers. Louis XIV kept his left-Rhine acquisitions, but had to restitute Freiburg, Breisach and Kehl.

When Maria Theresa required her troops to head to the east to fight against Frederick the Great during the Second War of the Austrian Succession and moved them from the western forelands (there were still 6,000 men patrolling Freiburg), the French saw an opportunity of another attack on the cities neighbouring the Rhine. First, under marshal François de Franquetot de Coigny, they defeated the Austrians at Wissembourg on July 5, 1744, and then moved into Breisgau. Louis XV personally led the cannonade of Freiburg from Lorettoberg. He took quarters at the castle of Munzingen.

After a siege lasting six weeks, Freiburg surrendered and after 1638, 1677 and 1713, the French occupied the city and fortress of Freiburg for the fourth time. After the Treaty of Füssen, Louis XV had to give the city back to the Habsburgers. Before that, however, the French dragged down their fortifications they had built fifty years previously and blew them up to the point where all the houses around the city which were located near the fortifications were now ruined. Only the Breisacher Tor remained from the buildings developed by Vauban. There was bitter poverty in the city. In 1754, only 1627 men and 2028 women lived in Freiburg.

In 1770, Freiburg was the home for a day and a half of Marie Antoinette's bridal costume. The "Dauphin of France" was warmly received by the citizens of Freiburg. The Court of Audit in Vienna however were not so impressed, which complained about the effort involved. Emperor Joseph II visited Freiburg in 1777, where he expressed sternly in a letter to his mother Maria Theresa from the 20th and 24 July his disapproval of the city, the university and the commandant's office. The city renamed the "Große Gasse" with "Kaiser-Joseph-Straße and the "Hotel Storchen" to honour Joseph II to "Hotel zum Römischer Kasier".

== The consequences of the French Revolution ==
When the French Revolution broke out in 1789, the three-estate-based society in the German states including Freiburg, which had developed over many centuries, was met unprepared by the change.

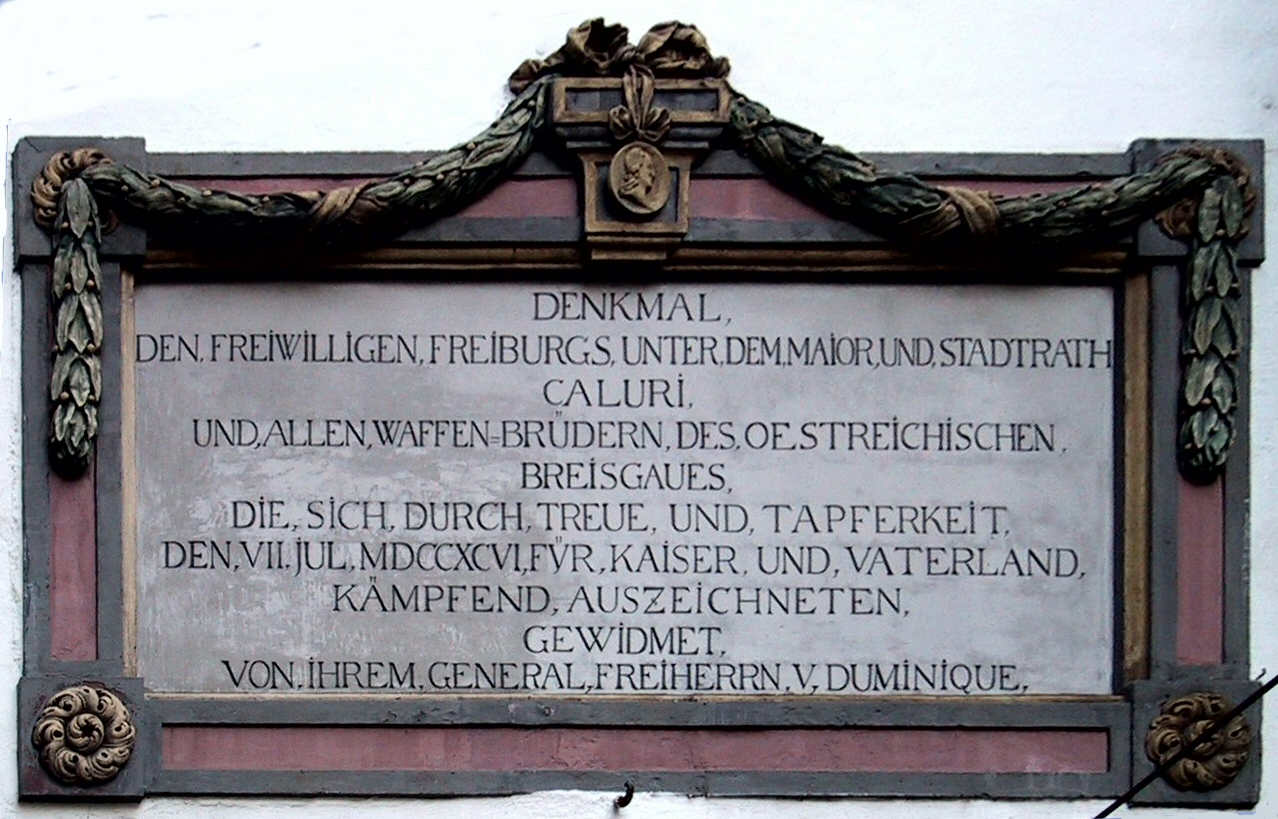
Memorial plaque on the Martinstor for the members of the militia of Breisgau, who fell in the war against the French Revolutionary Army.

In Breisgau, the first or spiritual state was the most important despite the secularisation of a part of the church's possessions, because of its abundant wealth, including the monasteries of St. Peter, St. Blasien and St. Trudpert. The second state included the old imperial aristocracy with its lands, but also the low-income knights established by the generous ennoblement of the Habsburgers. They gave a firm scaffolding for administrative officers, lawyers and university professors of the feudal society. In the third state were the bourgeoisie, well organised in guilds and who had come into prosperity. Peasants, even if they were no longer under serfdom, were still dependent on the ecclesiastical and secular landowners.

Inwardly, it remained quiet in Breisgau, as our nation was ... neither so spoiled, nor so depressed, nor as enthusiastic, as Leopold II, Holy Roman Emperor found in far-away Vienna. However the possessions owned by the Habsburgers were directly threatened, when the National Convention in Paris in 1792 decided to secure the "national boundaries" of France, and the achievements of the Revolution in other European countries. The Mayor of Freiburg Joseph Thaddäus von Sumerau addressed his emperor in Vienna: "My heart bleeds when I think that these good, loyal subjects are to be surrendered to the robbery and murder of their neighbours, the cannibals.

After the revolutionary army had occupied the Empire's key of Breisach, the French captured Freiburg in the Summer of 1796. This, however, was only after the efforts of the militia's resistance led by "Mayor and Town Council Ignaz Caluri". Following this Sumeraus' brother-in-law General Max Freiherr von Duminique (1739-1804) put his troops' names on a plaque, which can be found today on the Martinstor.

This time, however, the Habsburgers did not abandon their holdings on the right of the Rhine. After three months, Archduke Charles, Duke of Teschen drove the French out of Freiburg.

== Napoleonic Times ==
After several Austrian defeats in Upper Italy against the revolutionary groups of the French army led by commander Napoleon Bonaparte, he then captured the conquered territories of the Cisalpine Republic in accordance with the Treaty of Campo Formio. This also meant that Ercole III d'Este, Duke of Modena lost his Italian possessions but received Breisgau as compensation in 1801 as stated in the Treaty of Lunéville. Ercole III, however, disagreed with this exchange since he did not consider his losses to be sufficiently compensated. Even after the defeat of Austria at the War of the Second Coalition in 1801, when the Prince was given the title of Ortenau, the change of rule took place only hesitantly. Hermann von Greiffenegg, who formally controlled Breisgaun on 2 March 1803 on behalf of the House of Este, led government affairs. After Ercole died in October 1803, Breisgau was passed onto his daughter Maria Beatrice d'Este, Duchess of Massa, who was married to the Austrian Archduke Ferdinand, the uncle of Emperor Francis II. Breisgau then belonged practically to the Habsburgers, even when the reigning powers formally passed to a side line.

In 1805, Francis II (now Austrian Emperor Francis I) once again challenged the self-proclaimed French Emperor Napoleon during the War of the Third Coalition. However, Austria suffered a crushing defeat at the Battle of Austerlitz. Thus, the Modenish-Habsburg interlude for Breisgau and Ortenau lasted only briefly, because Napoleon located in occupied Vienna, commanded that these areas have passed to Baden. Freiburg was degraded from an outpost of Habsburg on the Upper Rhine to a provincial town in a buffer state promoted by Napoleon's grace in 1806 to the Grand Duchy of Baden.

Mercilessly, Napoleon squeezed money from the coalition states and especially for fresh troops which he needed for his campaign against Russia. Among the 412,000 of men in the Grande Armée, who fought in wars leading to Moscow, there were around 150,000 Germans, but only 1,000 of them returned to Germany after the wars.

The death toll increased the anti-Napoleonic mood in the German lands, but, in Prussia, Freikorps were raised against the Napoleonic rule. In 1813, Charles Frederick, Grand Duke of Baden, at the Battle of Leipzig, had the Baden mercenaries fighting on Napoleon's side fight within his framework of obligations in the Confederation of the Rhine. It is not surprising that the Baden coat of arms was demolished in Freiburg, formerly ruled by the Habsburgs, from the local government building and an imperial double eagle replaced it.

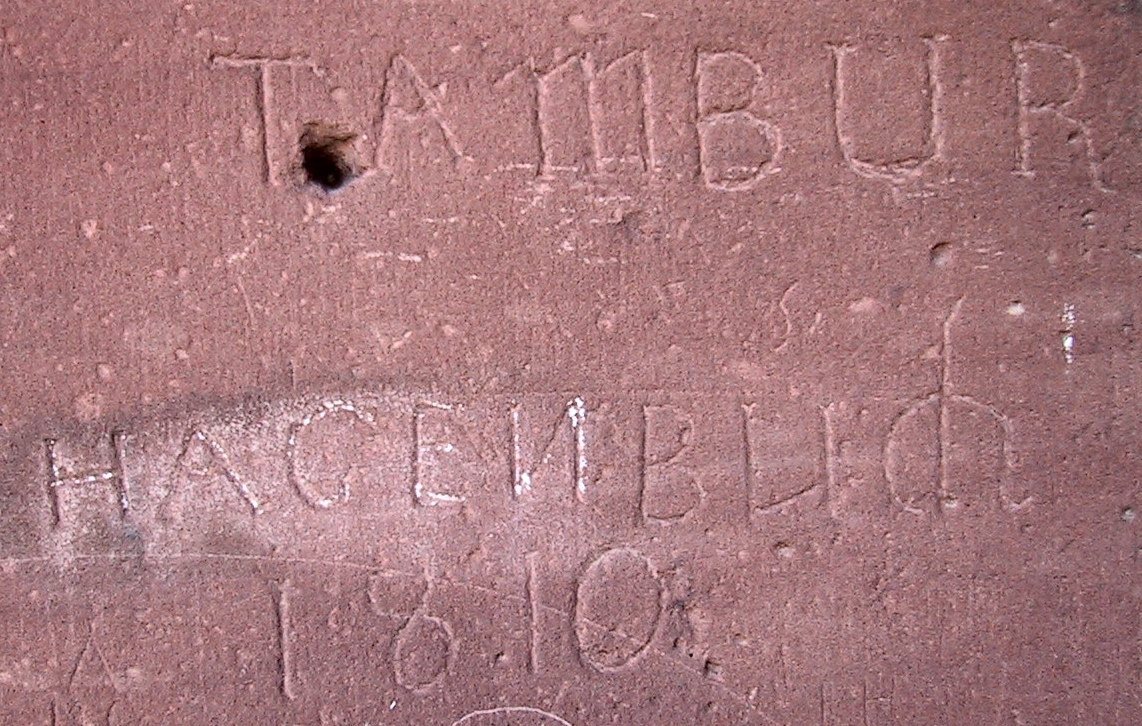
Graffiti made by a presumed German-speaking drummer of the Napoleonic army in 1810 on the outside of the Minster.

== Freiburg finally part of Baden ==
When the troops, who had allied themselves against Napoleon, moved through Freiburg on the way to Paris in the winter of 1813, a meeting took place between the Austrian Emperor Francis I (formerly Roman-German Emperor Francis II), the Russian tsar Alexander II and the Prussian king Frederick William III. Citizens of Freiburg, who were loyal to the Habsburgers, prepared an enthusiastic reception. Old feelings broke out: Vienna and Catholic Austria led by the Habsburgs were closer to the citizens of Freiburg than those in Karlsruhe and Protestant North Baden.

All political efforts conducted by the City Council of Freiburg, however, did not help. Freiburg and Breisgau had closer ties to Baden. When the final renunciation of the former Austrian forelands took place at the Congress of Vienna, Klemens von Metternich compromised on the Franco-Habsburg conflict of interests concerning the Rhine, which had lasted for centuries, but this created a new potential Franco-Prussian conflict of interests. This was because Prussia instead of Austria took over the Wacht am Rhein with its new acquisitions in the Lower Rhine,

Freiburg did not return to Austria's mild hand. Many people were disappointed but also saw the opportunity for liberalisation. Freiburg professor and Liberal Karl von Rotteck also complained about the "break-up of the mild sceptre, which had been a delight to us for centuries" but then worked on the right-liberal constitution of Baden and saw in it an agreeable element. "We have got a standing constitution, a political life as people... we are not the people of Baden. But from now on, we are One People, have a collective will and a collective right".

== Restoration of the Grand Duchy of Baden ==
The Carlsbad Decrees stifled the hope of a political liberalisation in the German lands, which had spread during the Wars of Liberation. Although Baden had a comparatively liberal constitution, the government operated a reactionary policy in Karlsruhe. The bourgeoisie fell back into the Biedermeier family. In the years following the Congress of Vienna, Freiburg developed into an economic and political centre of the Upper Rhine. Within Freiburg, Freiburg was the seat of a municipal office and two state council offices, which were united in 1819 to one council in Freiburg, into which the communities of the dissolved St. Peter's office were integrated. In 1827, Freiburg became the seat of the newly founded Archdiocese of Freiburg with the Freiburg Minster acting as an episcopal church.

When Grand Duke Louis I died in 1830, the people of Baden had high expectations of his successor, Leopold, who was fully acquainted with the constitutional monarchy. His new cabinet, with progressive members, passed a liberal press law during the Christmas of 1831, but as early as July 1832, the Baden government reintroduced pre-censure due to the pressure ensued by the Federal Convention based in Frankfurt. The following student protests in Freiburg lasted until the autumn. On 12 September 1832, the government decreed the closure of the university because of the pernicious direction which the university has been taking for a considerable length of time in terms of politics and morals in the greater part, and the resulting, but no less damaging influence on the scientific education of the students. After Karl von Rotteck's protest against a despotic change in the university's constitution, under which the teaching enterprise was resumed, the government forced him and the liberal professor Carl Theodor Welcker into early retirement on 26 October 1832. Their newspaper, Der Freisinnige was also banned. From 1832, Freiburg was the seat of Upper Rhine council which included several administrative bodies.

When Karl von Rotteck was elected as mayor in Freiburg by an overwhelming majority in 1833, the government informed then that: after a prudent collegial consultation, the retired Grand Councillor and Professor Dr. Karl von Rotteck elected as the mayor of Freiburg, the confirmation as herewith is to fail. In order to avoid the reprisals against the city, Karl von Rotteck renounced the mayor's office in favour of his nephew, Joseph von Rotteck. After the northern section of the Rhine valley railway had reached Freiburg, the opening of the train station took place in 1845.

== The Revolution of 1848/49 ==
When, at the end of February 1848, Louis Philippe I was overthrown in the motherland of the revolution, and the second republic was called, a liberation movement also awoke to the right of the Rhine. In Baden, it was lawyers Friedrich Hecker and Gustav Struve, who demanded unconditional freedom of the press, jury courts according to the model used in England, popular armament and the immediate establishment of a German parliament. Like everywhere across Germany, the revolutionary fractions in Baden were divided into supporters of a constitutional monarchy and a republic. The disputes over this question were culminated at a general assembly in Freiburg on 26 March 1848.

The establishment of the elected Frankfurt Parliament did not slow Hecker's vigour. He wanted an armed uprising and demanded the deputies of the St. Paul's Church in Frankfurt am Main to: pull with us instead of threshing empty straw in Frankfurt. Subsequently, on 12 April 1848 in Constance, he summoned the people of a provisional government to an armed uprising and, on the way, volunteered to go north. Government troops fought the revolutionary Hecker uprising at the Battle on the Scheideck, near Kandern.

Government troops, using the recently completed rail network from North Baden, were also ready to suppress the revolution in Freiburg. At Easter, around 1,500 irregular troops barricaded in the city and waited for relief from 5000 armed revolutionaries led by Franz Sigel. Meanwhile, government and Hessian troops tightened the siege ring around Freiburg. An advance guard of about 300 revolutionaries led by Gustav Struve, who had gathered in Hobern, advanced against Sigel's express command towards Freiburg. Shortly after Günterstal, the small team at the huntsman's well were met with superior government forces. After only a short battle, three soldiers and 20 irregular troops fell, which caused a mass exodus. When the rest of Sigel's irregular troops finally arrived on 24 April, Easter Monday, there were bloody battles with government troops, in which the badly armed rebels were quickly defeated.

After Hecker's failure, Struve jumped into the breach. In September, he led a march on Karlsruhe in southern Baden, coming from Switzerland. In Lörrach and Müllheim, he called the republic to act for prosperity, education, freedom for all! But even this amateurish attempt, in the style of the colloquially-written well-known children's book Struwwelputsch, stifled the fired of the government troops. Before a public jury (one of the revolutionary demands), Struve was deemed responsible in March 1849 in Freiburg.

The rejection of the German constitution by the Prussian king and most of the provincial prices, drawn up by the Frankfurt National Assembly, led to the Imperial Constitution campaign in 1849. This meant a renewed revival of revolutionary efforts especially in Baden and the Palatinate. On 11 May in Freiburg, a fraternisation of the Republicans with the 2nd Badisches Infantry Regiment took place. On 12 May, the people of Offenburg demanded the approval of the Imperial constitution by the Baden government. The Rastatt Fortress rose. When Grand Duke Leopold fled from Karlsruhe on 13/14 May, the revolution successfully won in Baden. The Grand Duke now asked for Prussian armaments in fighting against the uprising.

Whilst the Revolutionary Army was withdrawing to Freiburg after several defeats, a constitutional assembly was held in the Basler Hof, the Freiburg council building, on 28 June. At the request of deputy Struve, freed from his detention in Rastatt, the panel decided to continue the war against the enemies of German unity and freedom with all possible means. Colonel Siegl took over the command of the remaining Revolutionary Army, which had been encountered by irregular troops from Alsace and Switzerland.

The defeat of the Baden and Palatine uprising was carried out by Prussian troops led by "the canister shot prince" William I. On 7 July 1849, the citizens of Freiburg loyal to the Duke handed Freiburg over to the corps of General Moritz von Hirschfeld. The fighting had not happened because a change of opinion had taken place and numerous Baden Revolutionary soldiers were captured and taken into Prussian captivity. Hirschfeld release them all immediately. On 11 July, a Prussian war court sentenced the revolutionary Max Dortu from Potsdam to death. On 24 July, the fall of the Rastatt fortress ended the revolution. Afterwards, Prussian-Baden war courts were established and sentenced criminals. Like Dortu, Friedrich Neff and Gebhard Kromer were executed by firing squad in the cemetery at the Wiehre. In Rastatt and Bruchsal, 26 further revolutionaries suffered the same fate. The defeat of the Baden uprising meant for a long time the end of the revolutionary-bourgeois freedom and unity aspirations in Germany. The Heckerlied, or Hecker song, recalls the spirit of the revolutionary citizens of Baden.

== Gründerzeit and Empire ==
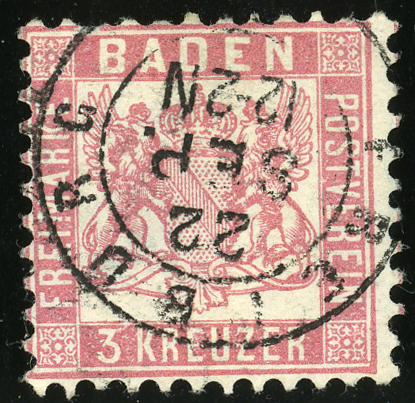
Freiburg in the Grand Duchy of Baden around 1862

In 1864, the city and state councils were merged into the Freiburg District Office. The District Offices of Breisach, Emmendingen, Ettenhiem, Freiburg, Kenzingen (dissolved in 1872), Neustadt in the Black Forest and Staufen all belonged to the new administrative region of Freiburg. In the same year, the Black Forest Association founded the first German hiking association in the city.

After the foundation of the Second German Empire in 1871, Baden proved to be a loyal part from the outset since the ruling house was also linked to the Imperial House. Grand Duke Frederick I was the husband to Princess Louise of Prussia and Emperor William I's son-in-law. After 1871 in Baden, as everywhere else across Germany, Sedantag was celebrated, but in the southwest Germany, the day of the Battle of Belfort was celebrated. In 1876, in the presence of William I, the Grand Duke and Bismarck, the official victory monument, Siegesdenkmal, was erected in Freiburg.

In 1899, the University of Freiburg was the first university in Germany to enroll a woman.

The city experienced an economic boom during the Gründerzeit, not least because of annexed Alsace, as Colmar, located left of the Rhine was connect by rail to Freiburg. Towards the end of the 19th century, Mayor Otto Winterer started a building boom, which was previously unknown and was named "the second founder of the city" in 1913 after serving for 25 years when he retired. As an aspiring and modern city, Freiburg operated an electric tram network. after this had replaced the horse and cart transport system in 1891. For this reason, an electricity plant was built in Stühlinger. In October 1901, the first line, Line A, was opened and connected Rennweg to Lorettostraße.

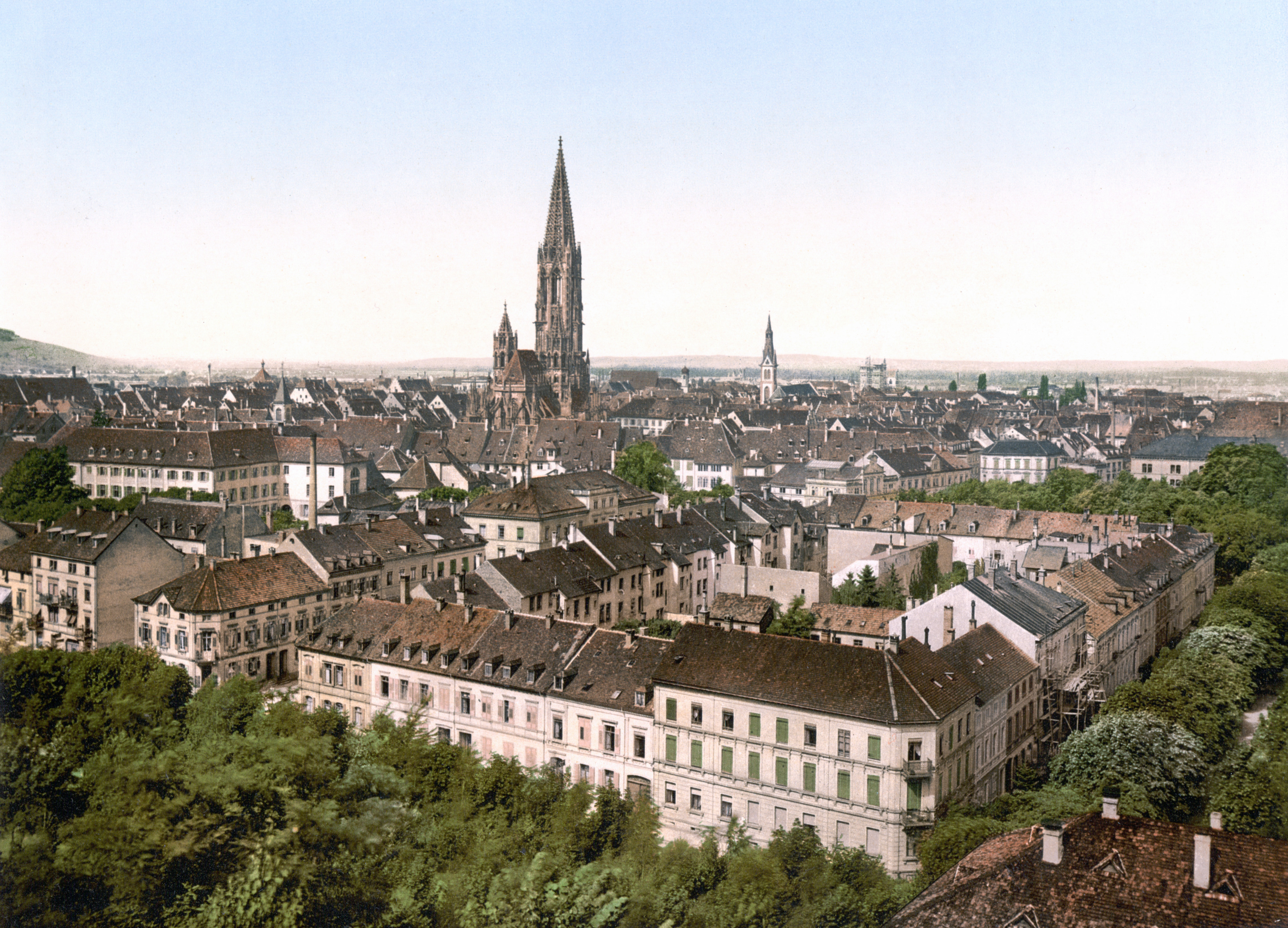
Freiburg around 1900

In 1910, the new city theatre was opened on the western edge of the inner city. in 1911, the opening of the new university building (Kollegiengebäude I) was built directly opposite the theatre.

During Winterer's reign as mayor, new residential areas such as the Wiehre and Stühlinger were established. As a result, the number of buildings and inhabitants of Freiburg doubled. This was also due to the influx of older and wealthy people from the industrial areas of West Germany or from Hamburg, where cholera was raging, so that the city got the nickname Alldeutsches Pensionopolis (German retirement city) from Gerhart von Schulze-Gävernitz. These soon accounted for 20% of households. The townscape set out by Winterer which was adorned with a lot of historicism and had a medieval appearance, met the zeitgeist. The proximity to the Black Forest and Kaiserstuhl as well as the warm climate attracted the people.

This idyll exhaled growing social tensions. Whilst the mostly attracted beneficent pensioners lived in the Wiehre (Goethestraße or Reichsgrafenstraße) and in Herdern (Wolfin and Tivolistraße), the growing proletariat lived in Stühlinger,

It was a monstrous provocation of the bourgeois idyll of Freiburg, when in April 1914, on the eve of the Great War, Rosa Luxemburg denounced class differences and German militarism in the crowded art and festival hall. To eliminate them, she called the workers to the general strike. Under the influence of the speech conducted by a traitor of Germany, as seen by the bourgeoisie, 280 citizens of Freiburg joined the Social Democratic Party.

== The First World War ==
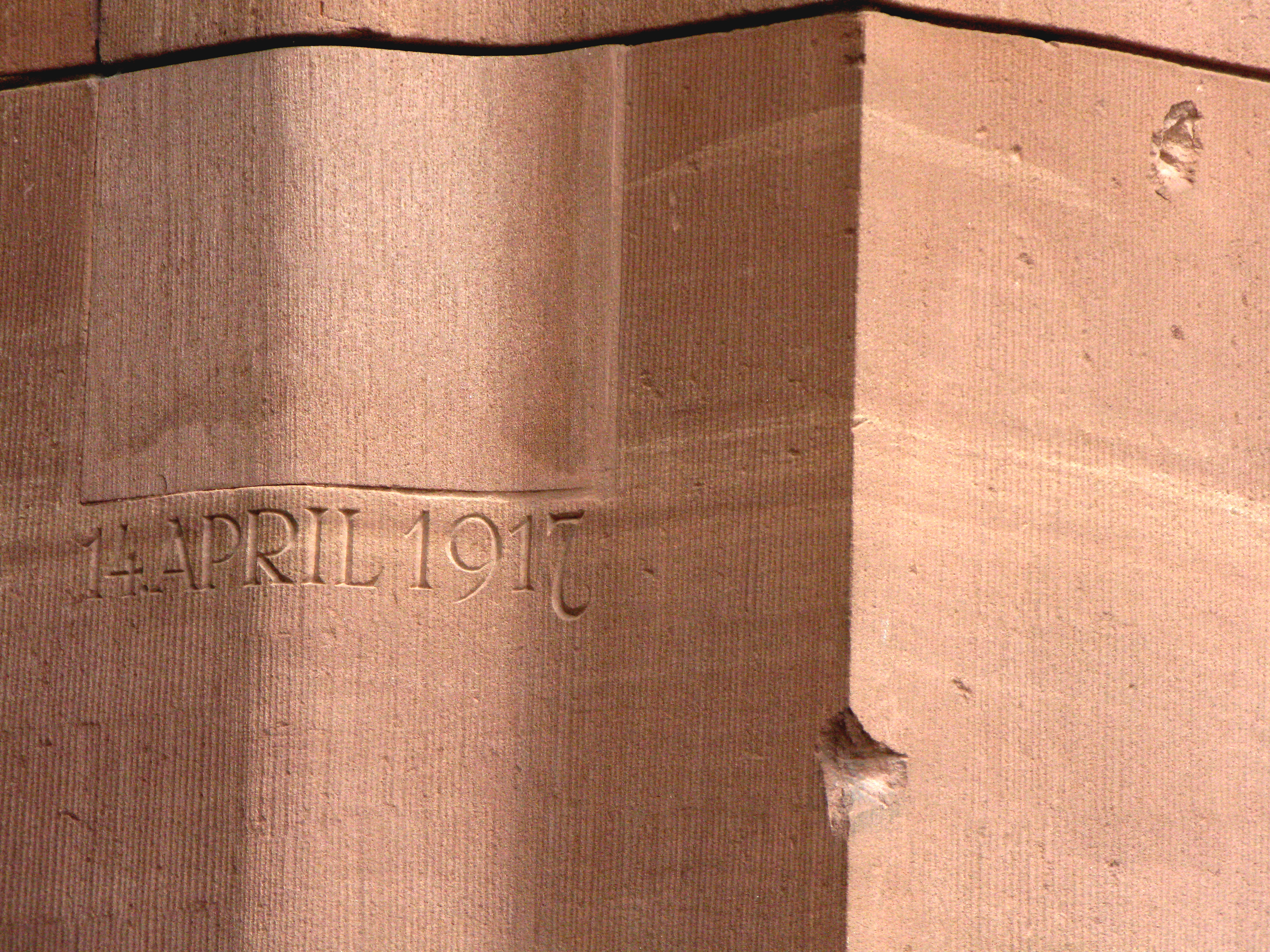
Traces of British bombing after an attack on the university's Kollegiengebäude I on 14 April 1917

The state of war, announced in Freiburg on 31 July 1914 in extracts, sparked great rejoice amongst most citizens of Freiburg (see Spirit of 1914).

The First World War also hit civilian population hard.

After fighting with French troops at Mulhouse, the first wounded soldiers arrived in Freiburg on 8 August. More than 2,000 injured soldiers had been wounded and taken to lazarettos set up in schools and gyms at the end of month. In August 1914, Mulhouse was taken twice by French troops and numerous civilians were sent to France in an internment camp.

In total, there were around 100,000 injured people taken to the lazarettos across Freiburg during the war. Also, lists of the dead were longer and published in newspapers around the end of 1914. During the First World War, the first time that the French Air Force (who at the time was leading the way) bombed unarmed people was in Freiburg on 14 December 1914. The German commander regarded this as a breach of the restrictions on international law according to the Hague Conventions of 1899 and 1907. The poor supply situation and the flows of refugees from Alsace were a serious burden for the citizens.

Year	Number of Bomb Attacks	Drop
1914	3	15
1915	6	50
1916	3	43
1917	7	102
1918	6	78
Total	25	289

During the First World War, the first time the French Air Force dropped bombs on the unarmed and open city of Freiburg was on 14 December 1914. The German high command regarded the breach of the restrictions on international law according to the Hague Conventions of 1899 and 1907. The aerial warfare against civilian targets was escalating more and more.

The German government used the attacks as a form of propaganda almost instantaneously, the names and kinds of injuries, especially those affecting children. Because of its proximity to the front, allied airplanes and zeppelins bombed a total of 25 times and thus more frequently than other German cities. They bombed Freiburg more than they did any other German city.

Air bombing increasingly changed public life. In December 1914, there was a curfew on attacks. From April 1916, blackout measures had to be taken. In May 1916, the city reduced its public lighting to a quarter and in May 1917, it completely turned it off. During the heaviest French air rad of April 15, 1917, there were 31 reported deaths.

The bombing situation showed that the supply routes leading through Freiburg to the front in Alsace had to be hit because there were no warlike targets in Freiburg. This meant neither the fortifications, the special artillery installations, nor the larger squad contingents or important armaments companies. However, the Pharmacological Institute produced bulletproof firing needles, while the Upper Rhine metalworks manufactured grenades, bullets and trucks.

In addition, the citizens of Freiburg experienced the war in nearby Alsace both visibly and acoustically. Gunfire on top of the Vosges could be seen and heard.

Soon, as in Germany, the first deficiencies could be seen by the lack of food supply to the population. Food cards, which were gradually being issued, and tickets for daily life needs were often not worth the paper they were written on. Due to the shortage of flour, bread was being stretched from potato starch and when potatoes were scarce, additional additives were found in war bread such as bran, maize, barley, lentils and even sawdust. When, in the summer of 1916, all bicycle tires had to be delivered, 10,000 bicycles were broken down for transport in Freiburg, Leather was one of the raw materials, which was no longer available at the start of the war for civilian use. Soon, the majority of Freiburg's uniforms were worn out of fabric with wooden soles or ran barefoot in the summer. In July 1917, most of the bells in the Minster were donated. After the German spring offensive had collapsed in 1918 and the defeat could be predicted as of August, Spanish flu was caught by the malnourished and the wounded in the lazarettos, from which 444 people died in Freiburg.

On the morning of 9 November 1918, more than 9,000 soldiers gathered at Karlsplatz, defending the orders of their superiors. On their uniforms, they wore red cockades. Military police shot but nobody was injured. Speakers urged prudence, peace and freedom. When, in the afternoon, the news arrived that Philipp Scheidemann had proclaimed the Republic in Berlin and soldiers' councillors first took over the city. In the evening, they united with swiftly formed Workers' councillors to maintain law and order in Freiburg.

== The Weimar Republic ==
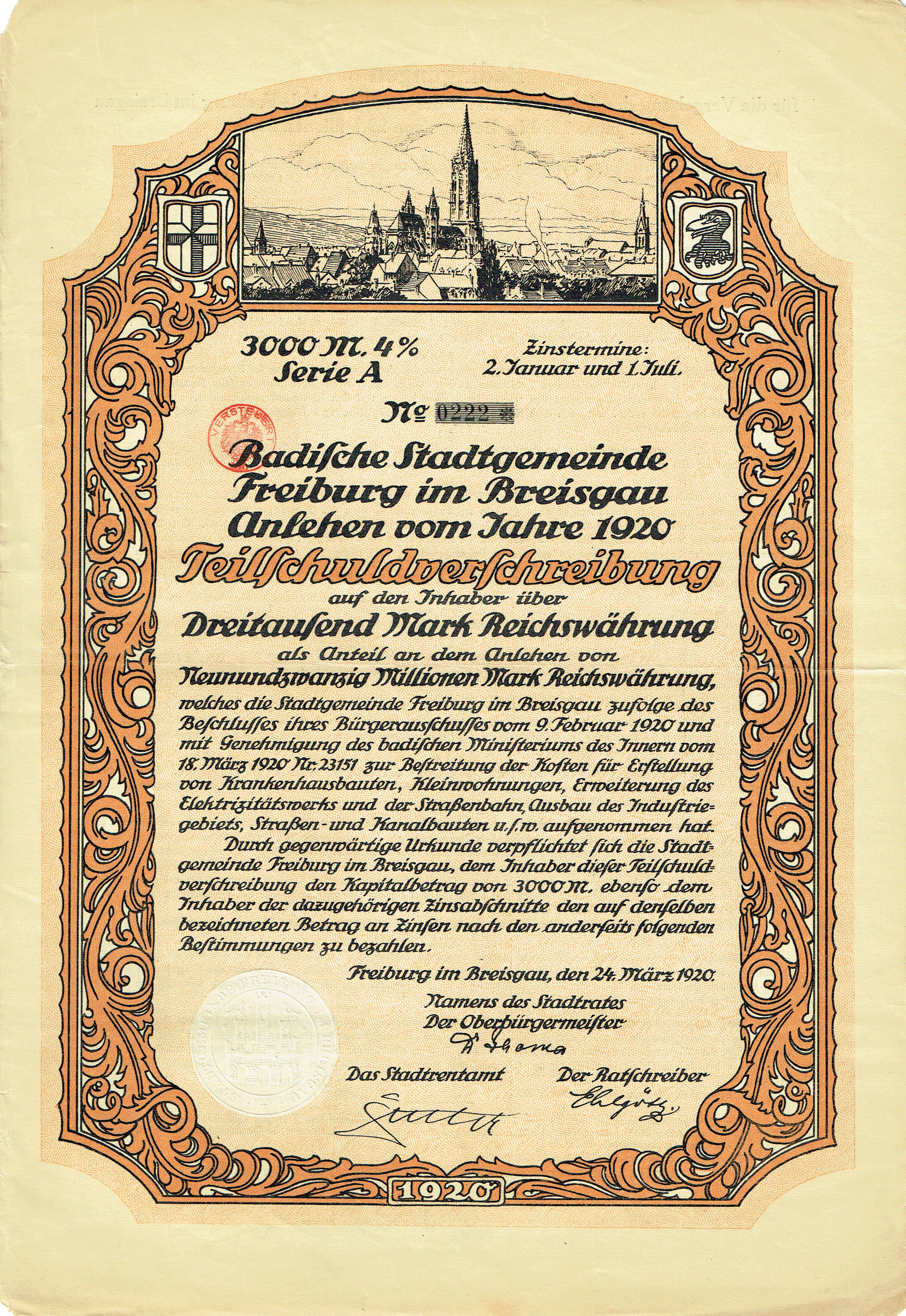
Bond of the City of Freiburg im Breisgau, issued 24 April 1920

The unification of Alsace to France after the loss of the First World War meant for Freiburg the loss of part of its land. The city also lost its garrison when a 50 kilometre demilitarised zone was established on the right bank of the Rhine, where industrial settlements were banned. Both of these contributed to the economic decline of the region.

In the newly founded Weimar Republic in 1920, 68 year-old lawyer, centre delegate and parliamentary president Constantin Fehrenbach resigned after the collapse of the Weimar coalition of a minority government from the Centre, German Democratic Party and the German People's Party as early as May 1921. This was due to the disunity of the coalition fulfilment of the Treaty of Versailles. His successor was the former Minister of Finance of Baden, the left-wing Centre delegate and Freiburg-born Joseph Wirth, with a cabinet of Social Democrats, the Democratic Party and the Centre, which had to begin with unpopular policies of appeasement. Wirth, together with his foreign minister Walther Rathenau, negotiated the Treaty of Rapallo (1922) with Russia and led Germany out of isolation in foreign affairs. In November 1922, Wirth resigned because of quarrels within the coalition.

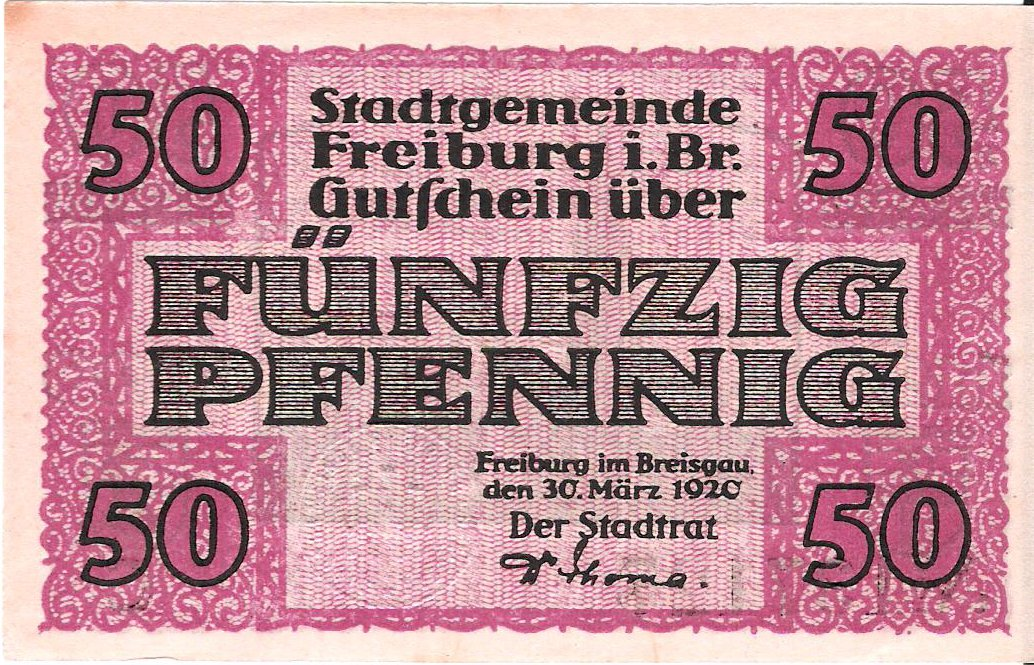
Freiburg Notgeld signed by Lord Mayor Emil Thoma on 30 March 1920

In 1923, in accordance to the initiative set out by French parliamentary deputy and pacifist Marc Sangnier, about 7,000 people from 23 nations gathered at the 3rd International Peace Congress in Freiburg to discuss ways of reducing hatred between nations, understanding the international situation and overcoming the war. One of the German representatives was Ludwig Quidde, a later recipient of the Nobel Peace Prize.

During the course of a district reform, the district of Breisach was dissolved in 1924 and its municipalities were largely allocated to the district council of Freiburg.

The Nazi Party was quite active in Breisgau from as early as 1933, but in Freiburg, a ground-centre party and a strong social democrat, prevented a premature takeover of power by the Nazis, similar to the way they took over the city of Weimar in 1932. During a visit conducted by Adolf Hitler in 1932 to the football stadium Möslestadion, the citizens of Freiburg started to protest. Since that moment, he was always shunned from the city. The further the economic situation worsened, the more the Weimar Republic lost the support of the population. On 18 January 1933, during a celebration in Freiburg of the founding of the Bismarck Empire, the German national parliamentarian Paul Schmitthenner conjured up the strengthening of the German military concept in the belief of an up and coming great German Empire which benefits the German forces and eradicates the weak, reconciles capital and work for an earthly kingdom in splendour and glory.

== National Socialism ==
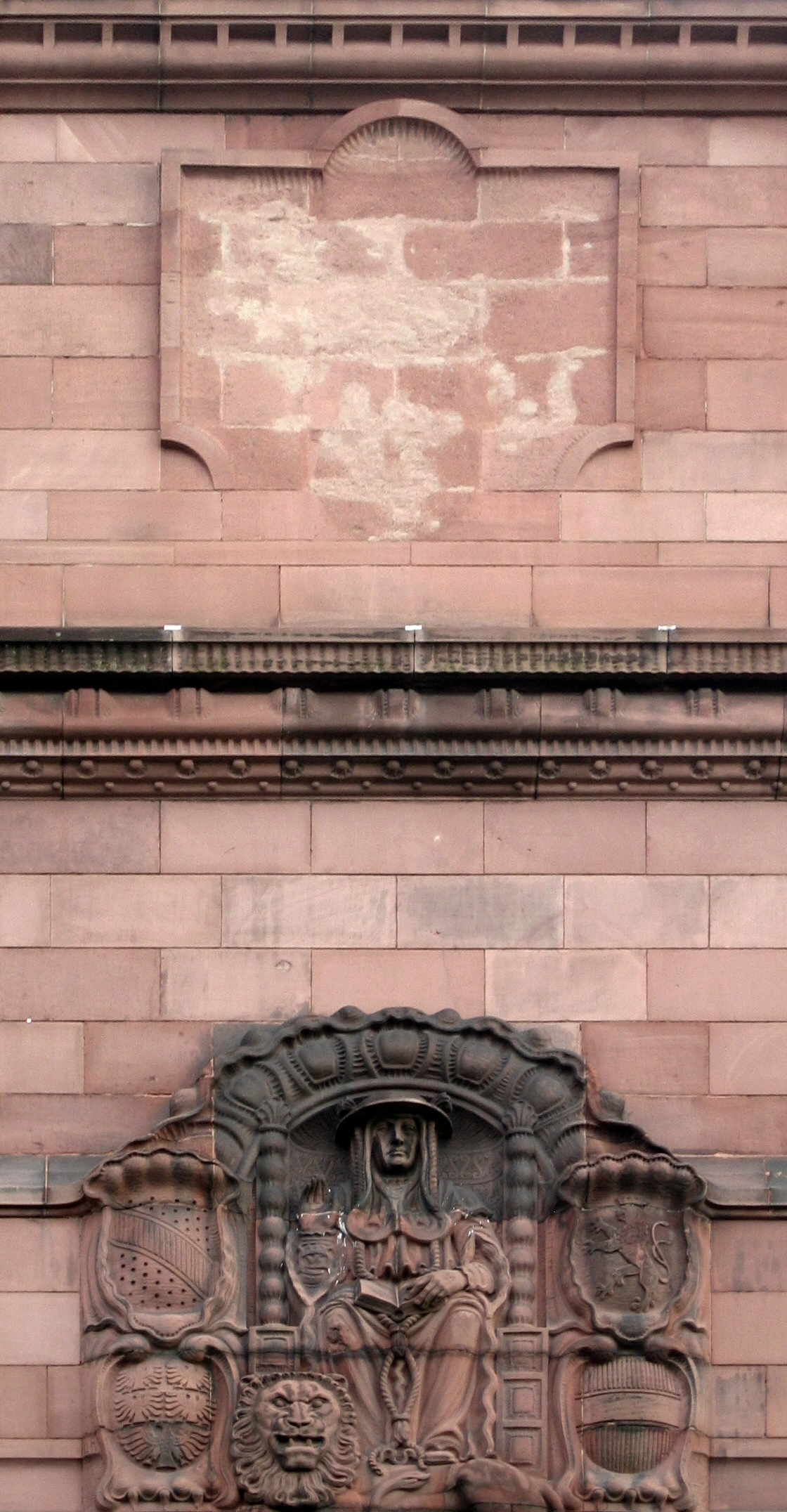
An outer wall of a university building which formerly bore the coat of arms of Nazi Germany

At the end of January 1933, the Nazis seized power in Berlin; Freiburg was soon to follow:

- On 6 March, the Nazis hoisted the swastika flag at the Freiburg City Hall without consent from Mayor Karl Bender, whereupon, the leader of the district and editor of the National Socialists' based in Upper Baden's battle organ "Der Alemanne" Franz Kerber, as well as SA-Oberführer Hanns Ludin, gave a speech from the balcony.
- On 10 March, the Reich Commissioner for Baden, Robert Heinrich Wagner, adopted the first set of measures concerning security and order in the state of Baden, implemented a ban on assemblies for the SPD and KPD and ordered protection for Marxist leaders. On the same day, a summary court in Freiburg condemned SPD party official Seger about weapons found in the Freiburg Trade Union House.
- On 16 March, mayor Josef Hölzl and city councillor Franz Geiler, both members of the SPD, were arrested at the city hall.
- On 17 March, between 4 and 5 o'clock, the Jewish Social Democrat Landtag deputy and city councillor Christian Daniel Nußbaum, while being arrested, shot through his apartment door and mortally wounded a police officer.
- On 18 March, all local organisations of the SPD and KPD, including their auxiliary and subsidiary organisations were dissolved in Freiburg with immediate effect.
- On 20 March, five members of the Nazi Party and a German National People's Party member declared the city council to be dismissed and named themselves as commissioners to govern alongside Mayor Bender.
- On 1 April, the citizens of Freiburg responded half-heartedly to the Nazi boycott of Jewish businesses.
- On 9 April, Mayor Bender, who had held office since 1922, resigned after a hate campaign conducted by the newspaper Der Alemanne. The government in Karlsruhe replaced Bender with Kerber. After Gauleiter Wagner had been relieved of his last non-compliant duties, Wagner had to report to Karlsruhe that the city council and the bourgeoisie are marxistically pure.
- On 17 May, a planned Nazi book burning session due to be hosted at the steps of the Minster had to be cancelled because of rain.

At the University of Freiburg, the new rector Martin Heidegger proclaimed the greatness of the National Socialist movement and the Führer cult and in his speech declared "the bloodthirsty forces as the only preserve of German culture."

On 17 April 1936, a group of English pupils were involved in an accident on the Schauinsland, five of whom died. The event was exploited as propaganda by the Nazi regime. Two years later, the English monument was erected on Schauinsland.

In March, 1937, the "SS-Reichsführer" Heinrich Himmler installed a series of collaborations between Freiburg archaeologists and his organisation "Ahnenerbe" from a two-week holiday in Badenweiler.

As in many places across Germany, during the Kristallnacht of 1938, the old synagogue in Freiburg went up in flames. Afterwards, a large number of Jewish citizens were taken into protective custody. Of these, 100 male Jews from Freiburg were taken to the Dachau concentration camp, north of Munich, for 18 years.

In 1939, the District Office of Freiburg was renamed to the administrative district of Freiburg. The city of Freiburg separated and became independent.

On 22, October 1940, the deportation of the Jews took place in Freiburg and across the whole state of Baden (first to the French concentration camp at Gurs near to the Spanish border, and later from there to the extermination camps). Numerous Stolpersteins were laid in Freiburg as an act of remembrance.

From early Summer of 1940 to November 1944, Josef Mengele, the Sanitätswesen, the concentration camp doctor of Auschwitz, who was notorious for his medical experiments on living humans, and his wife Irene had a joint apartment in the Sonnhalde district of Herdern.

== The Second World War ==
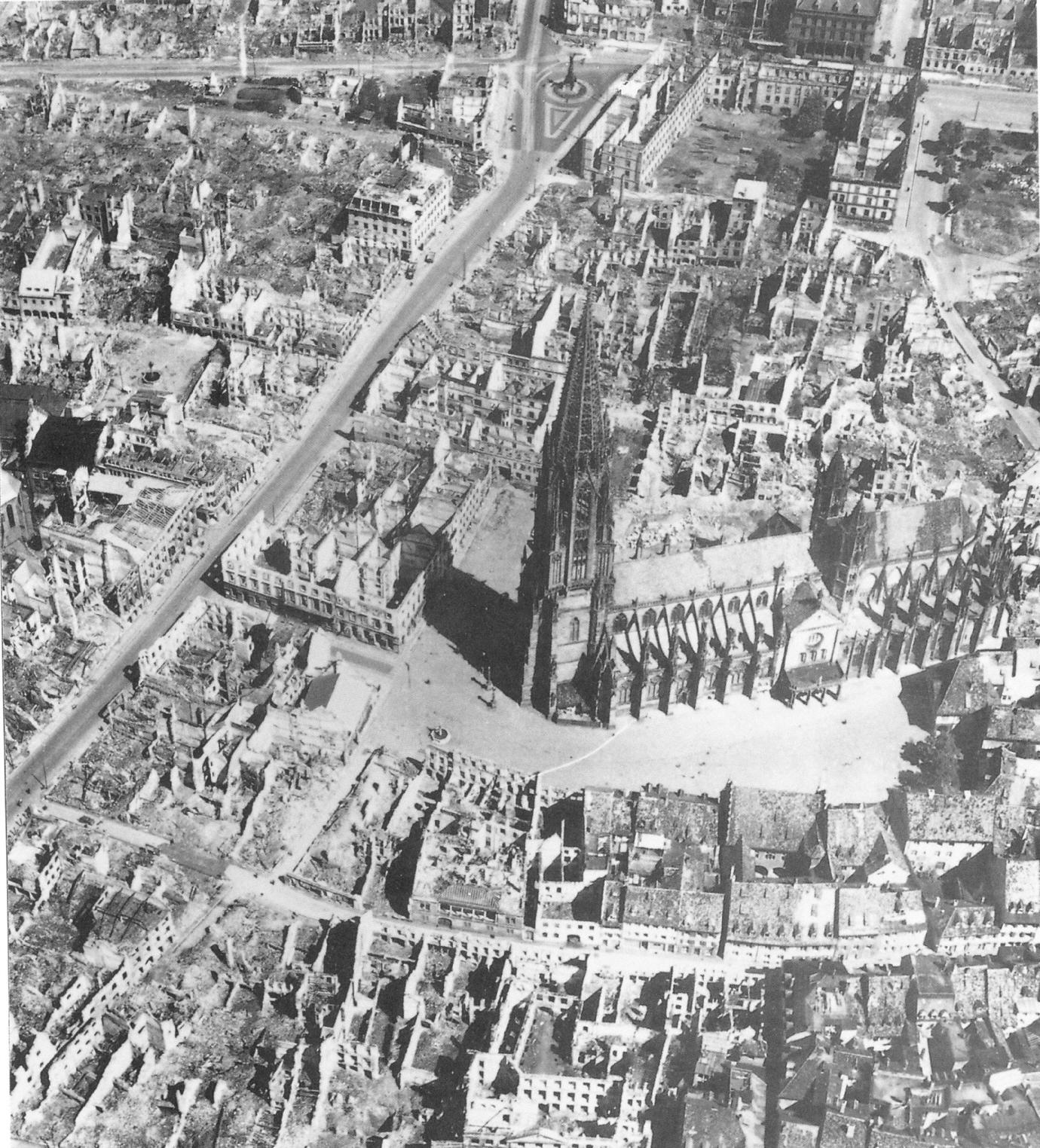
Aerial image of the bombed inner city with the minster largely undisturbed despite an air attack in November 1944

During the Bombing of Freiburg on 10 May 1940, the German Luftwaffe mistakenly bombed the city with 69 bombs and killed 57 people: the dead included 22 children in a children's playground, 13 women and 11 civilians. The official German news agency report of the bombing blamed the Western Allies, and warned that any further bombing of "illegal targets" would be answered with fivefold attacks on French and British civilian targets. The Freiburg police commander subsequently had the bomb fragments collected and was able to show that the bombs had been made for the Luftwaffe: it later transpired that the raid had been carried out by three Heinkel He 111s which had intended to bomb Dijon airfield in France.

Freiburg was largely spared from the aerial warfare conducted by the Allied forces. However, on 27 November 1944, the British Royal Air Force bombed the city centre as part of Operation Tigerfish, killing almost 3,000 people and injuring some 9,600 people. 14,525 explosive, fire and marking bombs weighing 1,723 tonnes were used and caused great damage. Further attacks followed on 2 and 3 December to the west of the Wiehre, damaging parts of the Ganter Brewery. On 17 December 1944, parts of Stühlinger were hit, whereby the Herz-Jesu church was heavily damaged.

Christoph Meckel, who spent his childhood in Freiburg, describes in an autobiographical narrative published in 1965, the blaze after the bombing of Freiburg's city centre as and the spot where, a few miles away, the silhouette of Freiburg could usually be seen, powerful flame was burning. The walls were flooded with twitching fires, the valleys were sunk in black shadows, the fir trees were clearly visible on the slopes of the Roßkopf mountain. Large orange smoke seethed up high into the night, drifting ferociously over the mountain tops and devouring all darkness.

In the midst of the rubble, the Minster remained untouched. Without any direct hits, it resisted impact thanks to its solid stone construction from the Middle Ages to the air pressure of the detonating bombs, which covered it. With roof tiles being donated by the city of Basel, the Minster was able to be largely covered again by January 1945.

== End of the Second World War and Reconstruction ==
On 21 April 1945, before the end of the war, the French marched into the ruins of the old town with the 2nd Regiment of Chasseurs d'Afrique. In October, General Charles de Gaulle held a victory parade on Kaiserstraße. Freiburg was a part of the French occupation zone. In the years leading up to the monetary reform of 1948, reconstruction of the city was slow. The rubble was transported from 1947 to 1949 to the Flückiger Lake by means of the Freiburg rubble railway, called the Volksmund Trümmerexpress.

As in many other places in Germany, Freiburg received help from the Quakers and donations made by the Swiss. During the winter of 1947–48, there was a lack of heating and food.

From 1946 to 1952, Freiburg was the capital of the country (from 1949 the a state of Germany) of Baden as a consequence of the division of southwest Germany into a French and American occupation zone. In 1951, efforts to merge Württemberg-Baden, Württemberg-Hohenzollern and Baden provinces into a powerful state of Germany, the Southwest State, led to a vote in which a majority of three states approved the merger, but the people from South Baden opposed it. Freiburg was the centre of resistance to the formation of the Southwest State led by Minister-President Leo Wohleb. They wanted to see the old country of Baden, along the Upper Rhine to Constance and to Mannheim in the south. Despite strong protests by the citizens of South Baden, the state of Baden-Württemberg was formed with Stuttgart as its capital. As the referendum was forced to take place again by court in 1970, only 18% of the electorate voted for the independence of Baden. Today, Freiburg is the seat of the administrative district, which largely corresponds to the former state of (South) Baden.

Freiburg also saw a steady reconstruction of the inner city, which was largely aligned with the original streets. In 1957, the University of Freiburg celebrated its 500 anniversary. In 1959, the first town partnership was established with the French university town of Besançon, which followed eight years later. In 1964, Freiburg featured on the route of the Tour de France.

Student unrest during the late 1960s also spread to Freiburg. The students demonstrated at the start against transportation costs which were increased by municipal transport companies. For the first time, police used water cannons.

In 1970, the city celebrated its 850th anniversary with several events.

In 1973, the administrative district of Freiburg became a part of the newly formed Breisgau-Hochschwarzwald district. Freiburg again became the seat of the new district but remained self-centred. With Ebnet and Kappel, the last two peripheral communities were incorporated on 1 July 1974. Therefore, the reform of the area had been completed.

In the 1970s, Freiburg developed into a centre of new social movements and environmental movement because of political awareness grew after 1968. The starting point were the disputes over the planned Wyhl nuclear power station where Freiburg's individuals and groups also took part. The successful prevention of planning gave decisive impulses for the emergent environmental movement in Germany. As a result of these events, a strong autonomous scene and a broad ecologically oriented spectrum developed in the city. Thus, Freiburg became a stronghold for the newly founded Green Party. Not just scientifically and economically, Freiburg developed a climate that gave the city a leading role as an environmental city.

In 1978, the 85th German Catholics Day took place in Freiburg. Amongst the attendees was Mother Teresa.

During 1980 and 1981, the "house fight" raged across the city. As there was still a shortage of housing, some of the houses, which had been levelled for speculative reasons, had been occupied. When reinforced police officers were deployed to clear the houses, students and supporters of the Autonomism movement campaigned for several weeks with fights in the street against the police forces. It was only with the commitment of a citizens' group that the situation gradually calmed down.

In 1983, the first Zelt-Musik-Festival, then in the city centre, was organised in Freiburg. In 1984, Freiburg was the first German city to successfully implement a transportable, low-cost environmental map following the example of neighbouring Basel. It has since served as a part of the newly established regional transportation association as a regional environmental map in the urban area as well as neighbouring districts Breisgau-Hochschwarzwald and Emmendingen.

In 1985, the Union for Aromanian Language and Culture is founded by the Aromanian professor Vasile Barba with its headquarters at Freiburg.

In 1986, Freiburg hosted the seventh state garden exhibition in Baden-Württemberg, which was of great importance for the development of the western districts and also led to the establishment of the eco-centre. The site of the garden exhibition, the Seepark, is now a recreation area.

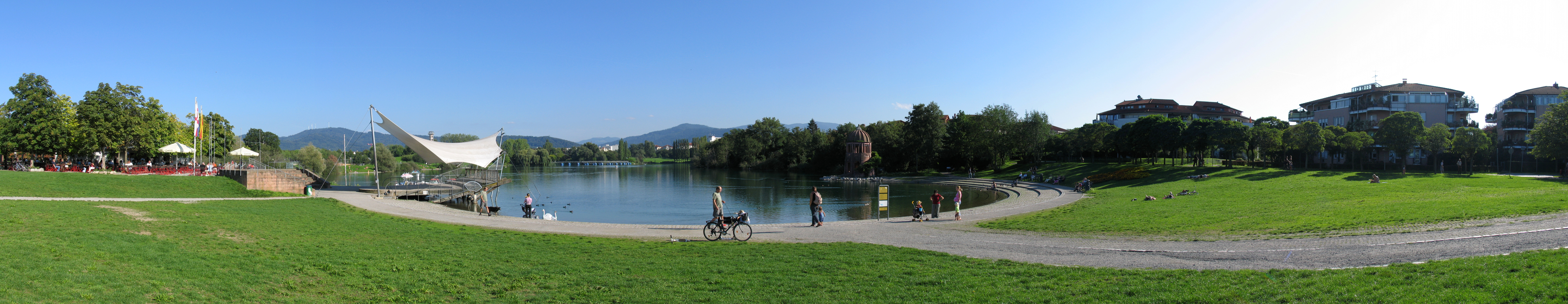
Lake Flückiger - part of the former state garden exhibition area

The population growth of Freiburg in the 90s required the expansion of old and the construction of new residential areas. On a site of the former Vauban-Schlageter barracks abandoned by the French garrison in 1992, the internationally acclaimed green district of Vauban,was formed. In 1993, the groundbreaking ceremony for the new region of Rieselfeld to the west of the city.

In 1996, the city exceeded 200,000 inhabitants. Amongst them included 30,000 students who were studying at the university and four other higher education institutions. In the same year, Konzerthaus Freiburg opened. In 2000, the first buildings of the newly erected Freiburg trade fair were completed. Both facilities are increasingly being used for congress, trade fairs and conferences.

== 21st Century Freiburg ==
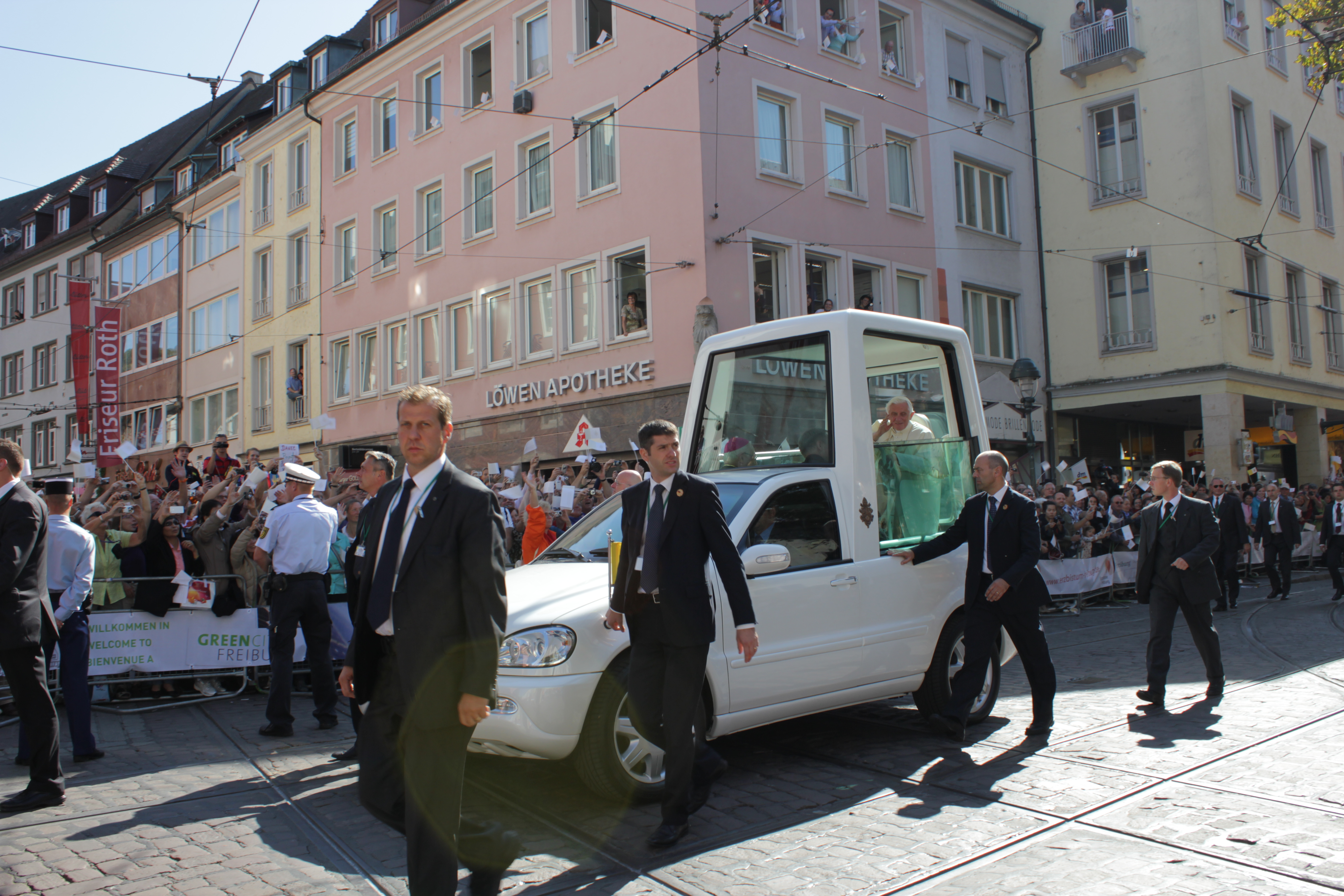
Pope Benedict XVI travelling in the popemobile through the centre of Freiburg

In 2002, Dieter Salomon was the first politician of the Green Party to be elected as mayor of a German city.

In 2001 and 2010, the German-French summit meetings between the heads of state and government took place in Freiburg.

On 12 February 2008, Freiburg's archbishop Robert Zollitsch was elected chairman of the German Bishops' Conference. With this election, the seat of the archbishopric and church institutions such as the German Caritas Federation, Freiburg strengthened its position as a centre of the Catholic Church in Germany.

With Freiburg's involvement in environmental issues, Freiburg was nominated for the European Green Capital Award in 2010. The city received 35 votes in eight place at the Expo 2010 in Shanghai as "Green City".

On 24 and 25 September 2011, Pope Benedict XVI visited Freiburg during his official visit of Germany.

== Economic history ==
The company Mez, which has been based in Freiburg since 1828 under the leadership of Carl Mez, had great importance for Freiburg. During the 19th century, it was the largest silk weaving industry in Germany, employing about 1,200 people at end of the century. From 1920, the company was gradually taken over by the Scottish company Coats, with the family being represented in the management structure. During the Second World War, production was forced to be stopped. In 1987, large parts of the administration and production were relocated to Kenzingen, while dyeing remained in Freiburg on Kartäuserstraße. A number of company buildings were given new uses, including the Südwestrundfunk radio station. After 2000, dyeing was abandoned and the site was rebuilt in 2007.

In Freiburg, the company Michael Welte and Söhne had its company headquarters (founded in 1832 in Vöhrenbach in the Black Forest, moved to Freiburg in 1873, destroyed by the bombing in 1944 and extinguished in 1952.) It manufactured pneumatically controlled music automatons, above all orchestrions. Since 1905, they also made reproductions of the Welte-Mignon pianos.

== Literatur ==
- Joseph Bader: Geschichte der Stadt Freiburg im Breisgau. 2 Bände. Herdersche Verlagsbuchhandlung, Freiburg im Breisgau 1882/83 (Digitalisat).
- Heinrich Schreiber: Geschichte der Stadt und Universität Freiburg im Breisgau. 9 Lieferungen. Verlag von Franz Xaver Wangler, Freiburg im Breisgau 1857–1860 (Digitalisat).
- Heiko Haumann, Hans Schadek (Hrsg.): Geschichte der Stadt Freiburg im Breisgau. 3 Bände. Theiss, Stuttgart 1992–1996. 2. Auflage 2001.
  - Band 1: Von den Anfängen bis zum "Neuen Stadtrecht" von 1520. 1996, ISBN 3-8062-0874-3.
  - Band 2: Vom Bauernkrieg bis zum Ende der habsburgischen Herrschaft. 1994, ISBN 3-8062-0873-5.
  - Band 3: Von der badischen Herrschaft bis zur Gegenwart. 1992, ISBN 3-8062-0857-3
