= Messe Freiburg =

Event area in Freiburg im Breisgau

Coordinates: 48.0158°N 7.8404°E

Freiburg Wirtschaft Touristik und Messe GmbH & Co. KG
- Headquarters: Freiburg im Breisgau, Germany,
- Key people: Katharina Schirmbeck and Jens Mohrmann
- Website: www.messe.freiburg.de

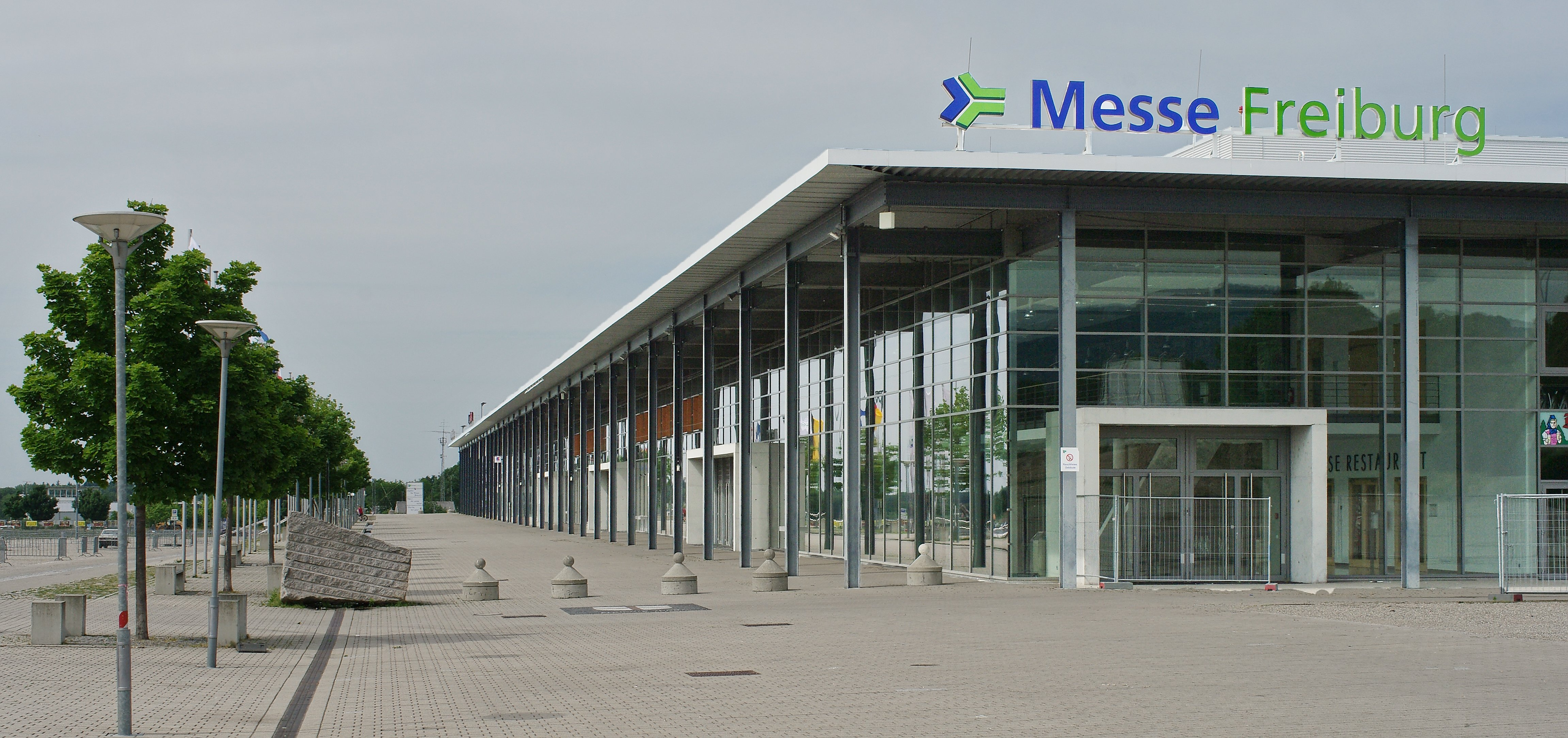
The main building of the new Messe Freiburg

Messe Freiburg (literally "Freiburg Trade Fair") is an event area and exhibition grounds in Freiburg im Breisgau, Germany.

== History ==
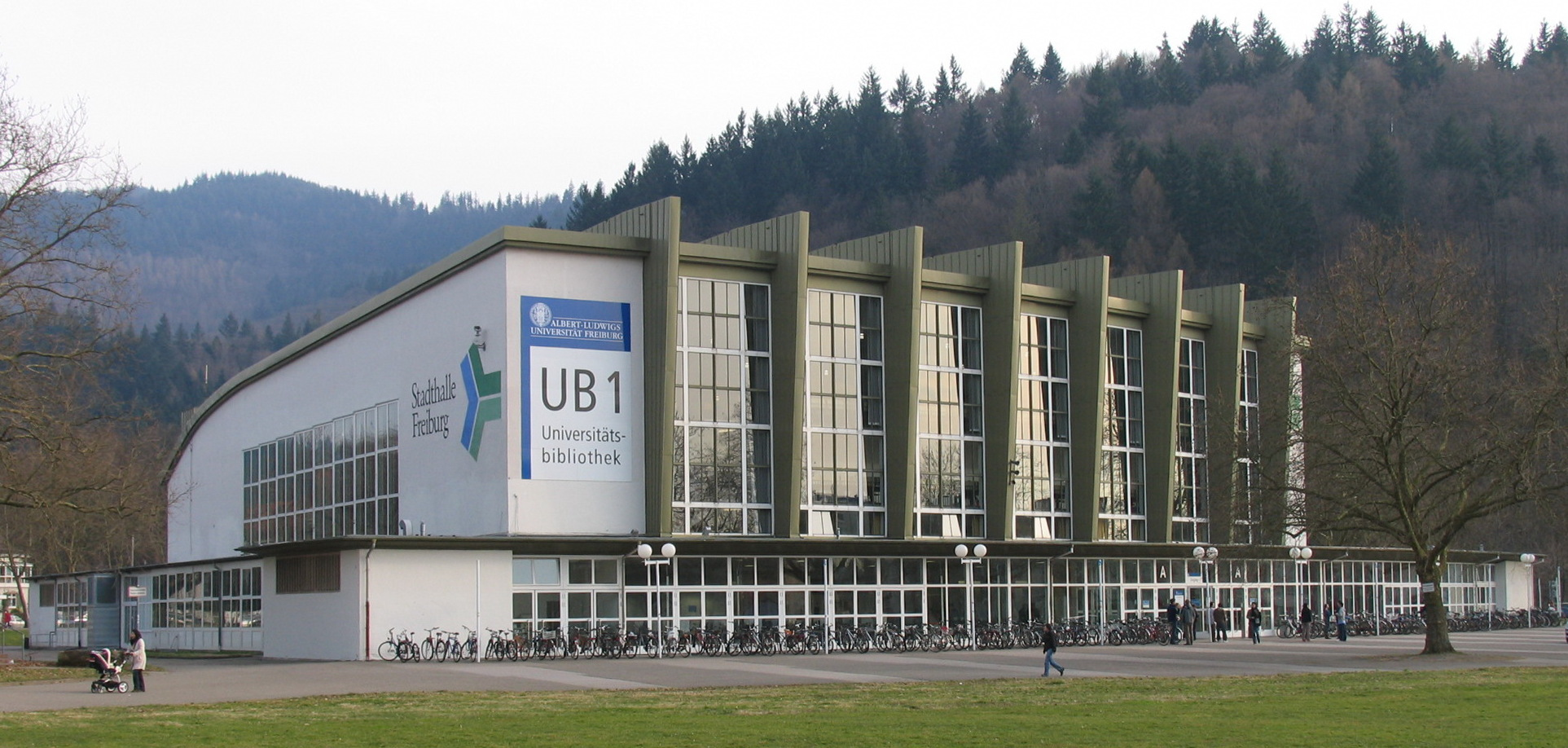
The civic hall as temporary quarters of the university library

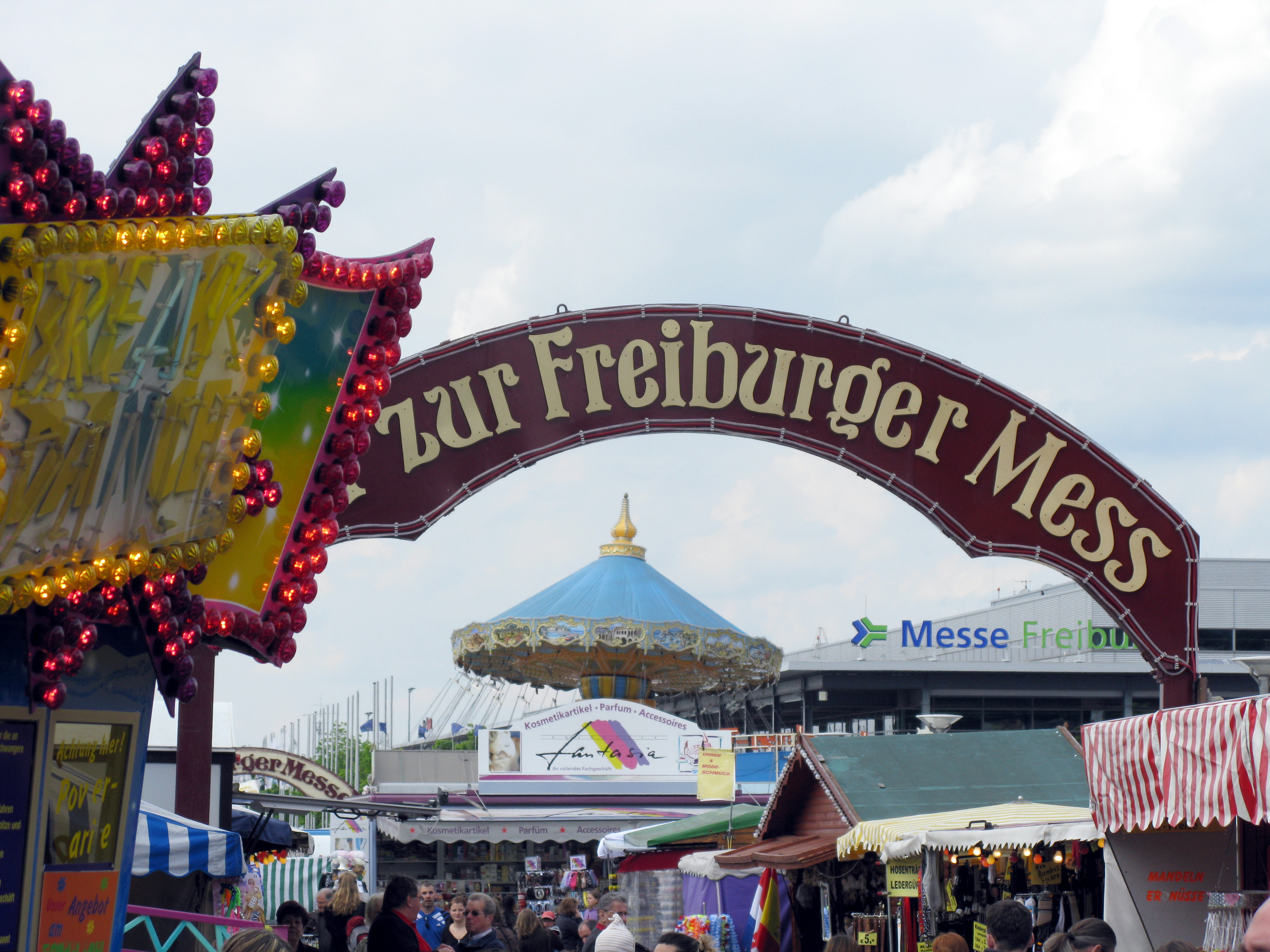
"Freiburger Mess" in spring

Markets are undividedly connected to the history of the City of Freiburg. In the year 1120, the establishment of the city tumbled with the market rights. Conrad I, Duke of Zähringen shows all in all that the first fair was allowed to take place because of King Wenzel of Prague in 1379. Subsequently, Freiburg was on the International Commercial Centre on many occasions during this year. The Münsterplatz, and also the Stühlinger Kirchplatz, used for leisure activities, were very important centres. Between 1885 and 1914, at least six "people shows" (human zoo) ethnological expositions took place because of the spring and autumn fairs in Freiburg, which were dedicated to people from Africa and Sri Lanka (previously named as Ceylon). The current ancient fair ground was inaugurated in the east of Freiburg in 1929. This had been used in the past for sporting events. The civic hall, situated on the Schwarzwaldstraße, was established to the east of the ancient fairground in 1954. This was according to the designs of Albert Maria Lehr. In the five decades that followed, the civic hall was used for social events, festivities, concerts, exhibitions and fairs. It was used as the provisional University Library from autumn 2008 until the new UB was completed in July 2015. Since the end of 2015, it served as emergency accommodation for refugees. In the meantime, the hall is under the protection of historic buildings and monuments.

The decision to move the Messe to the north of Freiburg was made in the nineties. The first construction stage, together with its three halls, was made up of 18,500 m^{2} of floor space and service areas and was only implemented after just short of one and a half years. On January 17, 2000, three years after the appropriate municipal council resolution, the construction stage was put into action. Due to the relocation of the Messe, building sites emerged on the “Alten Messplatz”. These enriched the current surrounding areas of Wiehre, Oberau, Waldsee and Littenweiler, including 180 new residences and a huge shopping centre (Zentrum Oberwiehre).

The first public festival took place in autumn 1999 on the new outdoor area known as the "Freiburger Herbstmesse". Due to the investment of 75 million Euros, Freiburg had four times more exhibition space at its disposal than before. Cultural events can now take place in hall 2 with up to 10 000 viewers. On March 25, 2003, the local council in Freiburg decided to build a fourth hall: the Rothaus-Arena. In November 2004, the construction began. The country supported the second construction phase of the Messe with a grant of 2,9 million Euros from the promotion program for investmenting in exhibitions. The total investment for the fourth hall was around 22,9 million Euros, which was predominantly provided by regional companies. The designs for the construction of the first three halls, subsequently the Rothaus-Arena and the expansion of its foyer were award-winning, making it an achievement for the architect, Detlef Sacker, who is from Freiburg. The new hall was inaugurated in 2006 as “Intersolar”, where the singer Pink made her appearance at the International Trade Fair.

The first construction stage, as well as the necessary connections to the roads and local public transport, including any further costs were paid with around 12,5 million Euros by the Badische Staatsbrauerei Rothaus. 4 million Euros came directly from the state Baden-Württemberg. Another 7 million came into the city treasury through selling property to the state Baden-Württemberg, which was used for expanding the University. The city invested more than 10,5 million Euros in creating the Messe Freiburg. Through the commercialization of the old trade fair in the east of the city, on which a new part of town and a shopping center were built, 12 million Euros were generated. The city paid more than 9 million Euros for the external development of the new trade fair and the demoliting of the buildings in the old location. The federal government and the state of Baden-Württemberg paid roughly 10 million Euros. All plans concerning the costs and schedule were kept.

The estimated doubling of the trade fair revenue to six million Euros by 2010 was exceeded in 2007 with more than 7,9 million Euros, and in 2010 with 15 million Euros. The indirect profitability of the Freiburg economy, trade and gastronomy, which was generated by the new trade fair, had tripled to 60 million Euros per year during this time. The biggest events in the last decades included: the Tour de France in 2000, an open-air concert by Herbert Grönemeyer with 54000 visitors, the visit of the 14th Dalai Lama, several TV-shows (Wetten, dass..?, Verstehen Sie Spaß?, Musikantenstadl,...), the world championships of indoor cycling (in 2005) and roller figure skating. The number of days when the trade fair was occupied rose from roughly 220 to 330 between 2005 and 2007. The revenue per employee of the Messe Freiburg is by now the highest in the country.

Pope Benedict XVI held a vigil mass on 24 September 2011, together with 28,000 adolescents on the exhibition ground of the Freiburg Messe, as part of his visit to Germany in 2011.

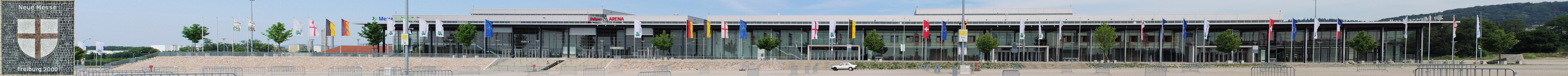
Front view of the four exhibition halls

== Location and infrastructure ==
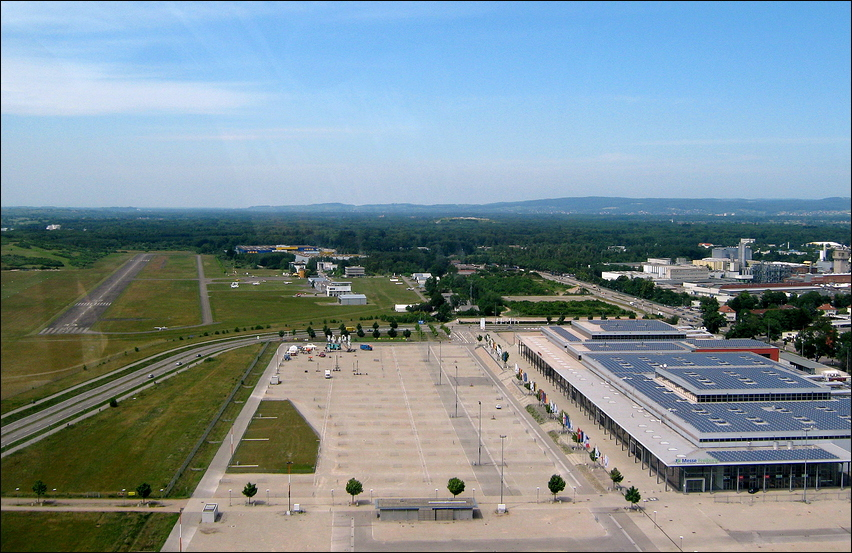
Aerial view of the airfield and the Messe Freiburg

The Messe Freiburg is situated 2.5 km northwest of the Freiburg Old Town and is in close vicinity to the airfield, the goods station, parts of the University of Freiburg, the University Medical Center and the Industrial Area in the North (Industriegebiet Nord). The Messe Freiburg is connected to the city center by the Breisgau-S-Bahn, with the station Neue "Messe/Universität", and since December 2015, by the tram-line 4 used as a part of the Freiburg city railway. The tram-line 4 will be extended by two stations by 2017. In the future the final stop will be "Madisonalle". 4000 Parking spaces are available for visitors who arrive by car.

According to its website, the Messe Freiburg is equipped with four halls, each with an area ranging between 2.400 m^{2} and 4.800 m^{2}, totaling up to 21,500 m^{2}. Additionally there are 11 conference rooms that can hold up to 420 people, 14 offices are available for rent, as well as an outdoor area of roughly 80.000 m^{2}. The area is used to host folk festivals, open-air concerts and exhibitions; it is also available for parking. The catering area contains three food stalls and a restaurant. Exhibition hall 4 is known as "Rothaus-Arena"; it is used as a concert hall, therefore there are adjustable bleachers as well as several seating arrangements. It provides standing room for up to 9,000 people.

In 2006, the company "Goldbeck Solar GmbH" provided a photovoltaic system with an output of 254 kilowatt-peak (kWp) for the Rothaus Arena's 6.500 m^{2} flat roof. The 1.210 solar panels are supposed to generate about 235.000 kilowatt hours of renewable energy per year. In combination with the solar power system, installed by "S.A.G. Solarstrom AG" on another part of the Messe, the power generation may reach around 650 kWp in total.

In keeping with Freiburg's traditions, a Bächle and several cobblestone mosaics have been created.

== Operating company ==
The operating company of the Messe is "Freiburg Wirtschaft Touristik und Messe GmbH & Co. KG" (FWTM), which is under the absolute ownership of the City of Freiburg. The company was founded in 2005 when the separate corporations "Messe Freiburg" and "Freiburg Wirtschaft & Touristik GmbH & Co. KG" (FWT) merged. The FWTM also runs the Freiburg Konzerthaus and several other venues. It is in charge of the economic development and promotion of tourism as well. Following the departure of Daniel Strowitzki in 2023, Hanna Böhme served as the sole Chief Executive Officer of the FWTM. Jens Mohrmann joined the management board as co-CEO in March 2025. After Böhme left the company at the end of 2025, Katharina Schirmbeck succeeded her on 1 April 2026, forming a dual leadership team together with Mohrmann. The chairman of the supervisory board is Freiburg's Lord Mayor, Martin Horn.

== Events ==
The events and fairs at the Messe Freiburg attract approximately 400,000 visitors each year. The number of events increased from 72 per year in 2002 to over 100 in 2008.

Since the very beginning, the trade fair "Intersolar" has been essential for the economic success of the Messe Freiburg. Thanks to newly created infrastructure, Intersolar had been moved from Pforzheim to Freiburg in 2000, where it is still organized, even after relocating to Munich because of its growing size, under the direction of the FWTM and their partner "Solar Promotion". Today Intersolar represents the FWTM in the US and in India. It generates more than half of the Messe Freiburg's turnover. Apart from Intersolar, the leading trade fair in the brush industry "INTERbrossa-BRUSHexpo" (Interbrush) takes place in Freiburg every four years.

In the field of consumer fairs, the Messe Freiburg increasingly focuses its own events on special-interest fairs such as the connoisseur fair "Plaza Culinaria", the "International Kulturbörse", the construction fair "Gebäude Energie Technik", or the property fair "IMMO". Furthermore, there are the traditional "Baden-Messe", the "CFT - Camping, Freizeit und Touristik", the "Automobil", the "Modellbau" as well as two second-hand car fairs and numerous guest shows. Twice a year, there is the "Freiburger Mess" held on the open-air grounds. It is the largest funfair in the region and attracts up to 170,000 visitors. Additionally, there are various markets, circuses and conventions.

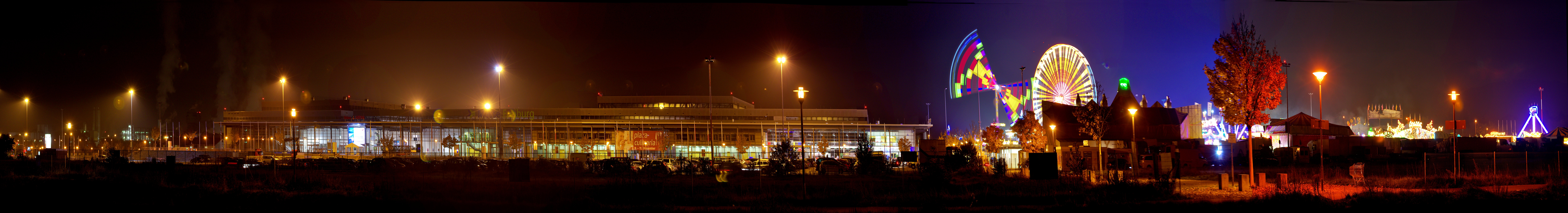
The Messe Freiburg and the "Freiburger Herbstmess" by night

== Literature ==
- Manuel Armbruster: "Völkerschauen" um 1900 in Freiburg i. Br. - Kolonialer Exotismus im historischen Kontext. Freiburg 2011 (PDF; 1,6 MB) (German)
- Peter Lepold: Freiburger Messe: ... ein Bummel durch ihre Geschichte. Promo-Verlag, Freiburg im Breisgau 1984 (German)
