= Heinrich Schreiber =

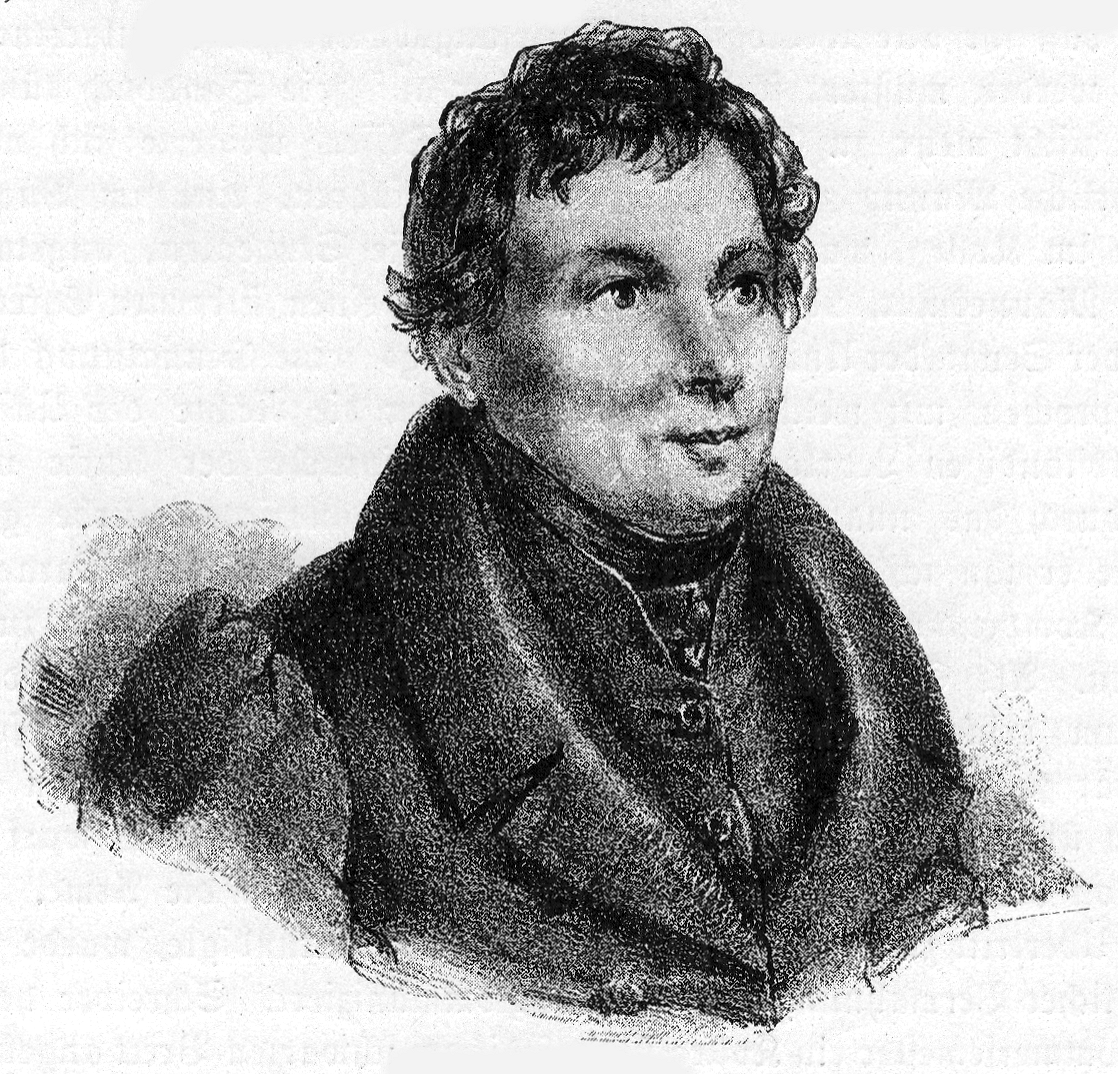
Heinrich Schreiber

Heinrich Schreiber (14 July 1793, in Freiburg im Breisgau – 29 November 1872, in Freiburg im Breisgau) was a German Catholic theologian and historian, known for his writings about the city of Freiburg.

He studied at the University of Freiburg and in 1815 received his ordination as a priest. Later on, he taught classes at the gymnasium in his hometown, then worked as a librarian at the university. In 1821 he obtained his habilitation, and five years later became a professor of moral theology at the university. In 1836 he switched from the theological to the philosophical faculty, and thus gave lectures in German literature and ethics.

Around 1845 he joined the German Catholic Church, an action that led to his excommunication by the Roman Catholic Church and his dismissal from the University of Freiburg. From 1846 onward, he devoted his time and energy to historical research.

== Selected works ==
- Kriegs- und siegeslieder aus dem 15ten jahrhundert; as editor (by Leonhard Wächter, 1819) – War and victory songs from the 15th century.
- Freiburg im Breisgau mit seinen umgebungen; geschichte und beschreibung, 1825 – Freiburg im Breisgau with its surroundings; history and description.
- Urkunden der Stadt Freiburg im Breisgau (2 volumes, 1828–29) – Documents of the city of Freiburg im Breisgau.
- Das Theater zu Freiburg, nebst urkundlichen Nachrichten über die ehemalige Schule der Meistersänger daselbst, 1837 – The Theater at Freiburg, along with documentary information on the former school of the Meistersinger.
- Heinrich Loriti Glareanus; seine freunde und seine zeit, 1837 – Heinrich Glarean; his friends and his era.
- Die hexenprozesse zu Freiburg im Breisgau, Offenburg in der Ortenau und Bräunlingen auf der Schwarzwalde, 1837 – The witch trials at Freiburg im Breisgau, Offenburg in Ortenau and Bräunlingen of the Black Forest.
- Die feen in Europa. Eine historisch-archäologische monographie, 1842 – The fairies in Europe; a historical-archaeological monograph.
- Die ehernen Streitkeile zumal in Deutschland : eine historisch-archäologische Monographie, 1842.
- Geschichte der Stadt und Universität Freiburg im Breisgau (7 volumes, 1857–60) – History of the city and university of Freiburg im Breisgau.
- Der deutsche bauernkrieg; gleichzeitige urkunden ... 1524-1525, (1863) – German Peasants' War; concurrent documents ... 1524-1525.

Also, he was editor of the Taschenbuch für Geschichte und Alterthum in Süddeutschland ("Paperback of history and antiquity in southern Germany"; 5 volumes, 1839–46).
