= Stühlinger Bridge =

Bridge over railway tracks at Central Station, Freiburg im Breisgau, Germany

Coordinates: 47°59′47″N 7°50′27″E

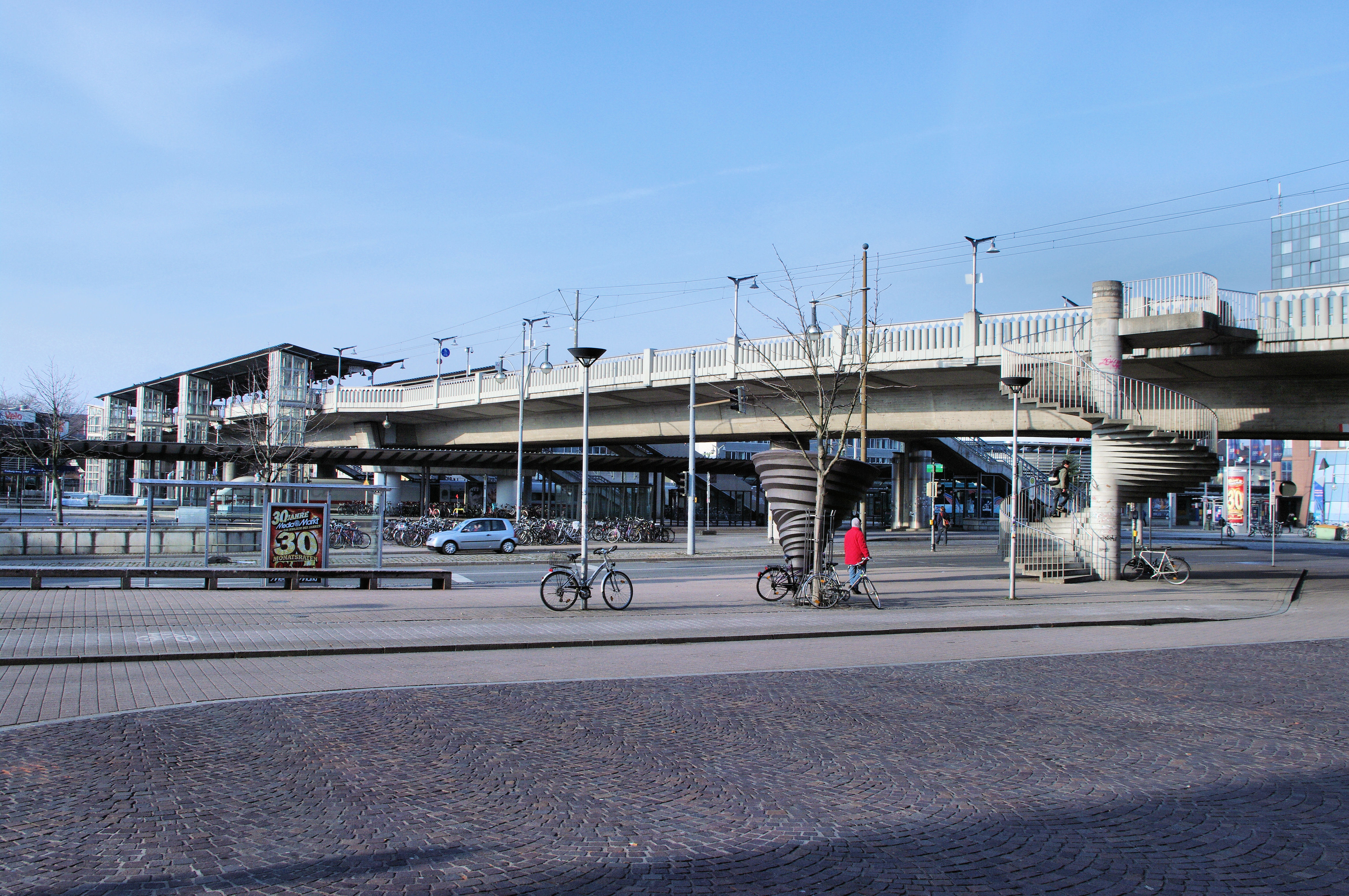
Stühlinger Bridge

The Stühlinger bridge was made of prestressed concrete for tramways, pedestrians and cyclists in Freiburg im Breisgau. It connects the Bertoldstraße with the Wannerstraße. In doing so, it crosses the Bismarckallee, the central bus station, the main railway station Hauptbahnhof, the Wetzingerstraße and the Stühlinger Church Square. The right short individual sections make it seem like an inner-city viaduct or an elevated highway in proportion to the whole length.

The Sühlinger bridge fulfills simultaneously three functions: it connects the Old City district with the Stühlinger district, it is used as a tramway station and as a pedestrian bridge overcrossing the main railway station and gives access to the railway platforms.

Since 2009, the bridge needs rehabilitation because water infiltrates the concrete. As soon as the rehabilitation is carried out, the cyclists are not allowed to use the bridge anymore and have to use the neighboring Wiwilí Bridge as an alternative one. The reason for this is the height of the guardrails of the bridge, which only rise up to 1,00 meter instead of the latterly legal required 1,20 meters. With the start of the rehabilitation, the hitherto grandfather clause runs out and the regulation is obligatory. The rehabilitation initially planned for 2012 was deferred until August 2012 because of delays and call for bids. Since they were still at the call for bids in the year 2013, it was not possible to make a statement about when it would be rehabilitated in November 2013. Now the rehabilitation is supposed to start in the spring 2019.

In the autumn 2013 the spiral stairs leading to the Freiburg Konzerthaus were underpinned with wood. Because of budget shortage of the civil engineering department of Freiburg in November 2013, it was decided to call for bids in autumn 2015 and that the rehabilitation of the stairs will start in the spring 2016. In the spring of 2016 they thought that the reparations could start at the earliest in the autumn 2017.

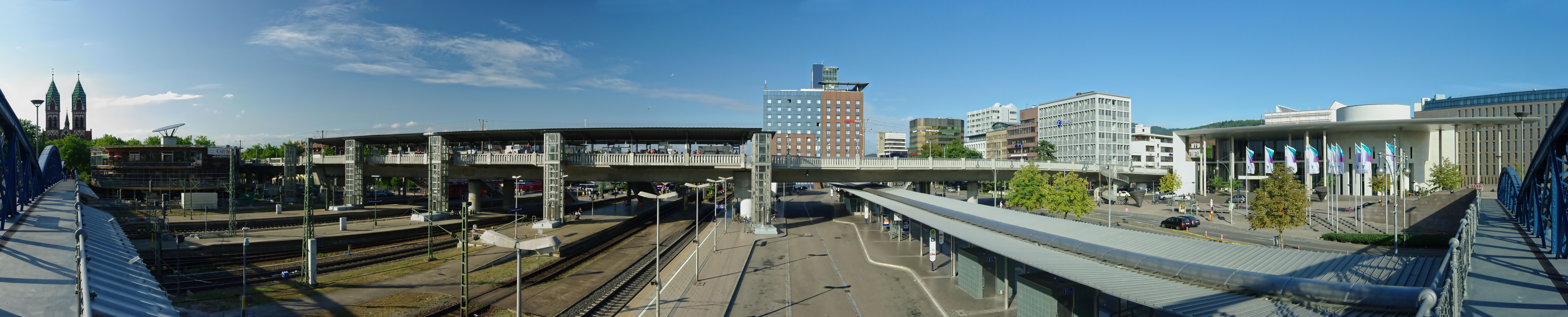
View on the Stühlinger Bridge from the Wiwilí Bridge
