= Old City of Freiburg =

Historic centre and administrative district of Freiburg im Breisgau, Germany

Old City of Freiburg Altstadt
- Quarter of Freiburg im Breisgau
- Interactive map of Old City of Freiburg
- Coordinates: 47.99472°N 7.85000°E
- Country: Germany
- State: Baden-Württemberg
- City: Freiburg im Breisgau
- Statistical districts: List: Altstadt-Mitte (111); Altstadt-Ring (112)

Area
  - Total: 1.19 km^{2} (0.46 sq mi)
- Elevation: 282 m (925 ft)

Population (31 December 2025)
  - Total: 7,441
- Time zone: UTC+1 (CET)
  - Summer (DST): UTC+2 (CEST)
- Postal code: 79098
- Area code: 0761

The Old City of Freiburg (German: Altstadt) is the central quarter of Freiburg im Breisgau, Baden-Württemberg, Germany. It comprises the medieval walled core (Altstadt-Mitte, statistical district 111) and the adjoining inner-city district Altstadt-Ring (112). The quarter covers approximately 1.19 km^{2} (0.46 sq mi) and had 7,441 residents on 31 December 2025 (4,118 in Altstadt-Mitte and 3,323 in Altstadt-Ring).

The Old City contains Freiburg Minster, the Gerichtslaube, where an imperial diet met under Maximilian I in 1498, the Haus zum Walfisch occupied by Erasmus, and the Basler Hof, where Louis XIV stayed in 1687. Its buildings and squares were settings for Marie Antoinette's visit in 1770, the revolution of 1848, events under National Socialism and the postwar constitutional assembly of Baden. The district includes the Augustiner Museum, the Museum für Neue Kunst, the Archaeological Museum in the Colombischlössle, the university library, Theater Freiburg and the Friedrichsbau cinema. Large parts of the historic centre were destroyed during the air raid of 27 November 1944.

== Geography and urban layout ==
Altstadt-Mitte centres on Bertoldsbrunnen, where Kaiser-Joseph-Straße intersects Bertoldstraße and Salzstraße, and includes Münsterplatz and the historic market-town lanes. Altstadt-Ring encompasses the southern and western central-city extension, including the Sedanquartier and university buildings near the Platz der Alten Synagoge. The two districts border Neuburg, Oberau, Wiehre and Stühlinger, which are not part of the Old City.

Within the quarter are Kaiser-Joseph-Straße, Rathausgasse, Herrenstraße, Konviktstraße, Schusterstraße, Wallstraße, Gerberau, Fischerau, and much of the historic street network near the Martinstor and Schwabentor. Wilhelmstraße, Moltkestraße, Sedanstraße and the area called Im Grün belong to the adjoining Altstadt-Ring rather than to the medieval walled nucleus. The Bächle are surviving water channels within the old-town streets, recorded from 1220.

== History ==
=== Foundation, medieval Freiburg and the Second Crusade ===
In 1120 Conrad of Zähringen and Berthold III granted market rights to Freiburg. The original market street, parish church and neighbouring residential plots formed the nucleus of the present Altstadt-Mitte.

In December 1146, Bernard of Clairvaux preached in medieval Freiburg during his campaign for the Second Crusade.

Around 1200, Berthold V initiated the enlargement of the parish church that became Freiburg Minster. After Berthold V died in 1218, the town passed to the Counts of Freiburg. The people of Freiburg eventually bought themselves free from their rule in 1368 and accepted the sovereignty of the House of Habsburg. Construction of the minster continued over several centuries and was largely completed by 1513.

The medieval Jewish quarter lay near Weberstraße and Wasserstraße. On 30 January 1349, Freiburg's Jewish residents were burned in a pogrom following false allegations of well poisoning during the plague. The attack destroyed the medieval Jewish community.

=== University, humanism and early modern town ===
The University of Freiburg, founded in 1457 and opened in 1460, initially used premises in the historic centre. Later university institutions in the Old City included the Jesuit college on Bertoldstraße (the Alte Universität) and the central university district around the Platz der Universität.

In 1497–1498 the city hosted an Imperial Diet under Maximilian I, with proceedings held principally in the medieval Gerichtslaube behind the Old Town Hall. The Kornhaus on Münsterplatz had been planned to provide a larger venue, but was not finished in time. The Diet passed a wine ordinance and adopted discriminatory measures against groups described in its legislation as Zigeuner (including Sinti and Roma), ordering their expulsion from the Empire. These decisions connect the Gerichtslaube to imperial government and early anti-Romani persecution.

In 1494–1496, the imperial chancellor Konrad Stürtzel had the palace now called the Basler Hof built along the present Kaiser-Joseph-Straße. It later became a major setting for the political history of the city. The Historisches Kaufhaus, constructed at Münsterplatz from about 1520 and completed around 1532, symbolised the town's commercial and Habsburg affiliations. The humanist Erasmus took refuge in Freiburg in 1529 after leaving Reformation-era Basel. From 1529 to 1531 he lived in the late-Gothic Haus zum Walfisch on Franziskanerstraße, a house built in the 1510s for the imperial treasurer Jakob Villinger. In 1531 he moved to the house known as Zum Kind Jesu at Schiffstraße 7, remaining in Freiburg until 1535.

The seventeenth- and eighteenth-century fortifications reshaped the perimeter of the Old City after the French conquest of 1677. The French king Louis XIV stayed overnight at the Basler Hof in 1687 during a visit to the conquered territories. Further military campaigns affected the fortified town, and sections of the fortifications were destroyed after the French withdrawal in 1745.

=== Marie Antoinette in 1770 ===
From 4 to 6 May 1770, Marie Antoinette stayed in the Old City while travelling from Vienna to France to marry the future Louis XVI. She lodged at the Kageneck'sches Haus at Salzstraße 1; the original building was destroyed in 1944 and replaced after the war. Her entry was marked by three temporary triumphal arches erected by the city, the estates and the university, and by theatrical and musical performances. One stage performance was held in the Jesuit college on Bertoldstraße. The ceremonies were centred on actual streets and institutions within the Altstadt, not an outlying palace.

=== Nineteenth century: from Habsburg city to Baden university town ===
At the end of the eighteenth century, the Old City retained a university, religious houses, and a series of aristocratic residences. The poet and university professor Johann Georg Jacobi was appointed to Freiburg in 1784, becoming the first Protestant appointed to the Habsburg university. From 1807 until his death in 1814 he lived at Herrenstraße 43, in the building now occupied by the Schwarzwälder Hof hotel.

Following the Napoleonic reorganisation of southwestern Germany, Freiburg passed from Habsburg rule to Baden in 1806. The Haus zum Ritter on Münsterplatz 6, used by the Breisgau estates until 1806, subsequently served the grand-ducal court before its use as an archiepiscopal palace.

The historian and liberal politician Karl von Rotteck owned the property at Rathausgasse 33, later known as the Rotteckhaus. His political activity was part of the city's nineteenth-century liberal milieu; the house was remodelled in 1936 by the architect Joseph Schlippe. The city's religious administration also changed fundamentally. In 1827 Freiburg became the seat of the new archdiocese; its first archbishop, Bernhard Boll, was consecrated in the University Church on Bertoldstraße on 21 October 1827. Between 1823 and 1826 the Collegium Borromaeum seminary and church were erected at the eastern end of Herrenstraße.

=== The revolution of 1848–1849 ===
During the Revolutions of 1848, specific Altstadt buildings and public spaces became sites of political agitation and armed struggle. A mass gathering took place on Münsterplatz on 26 March 1848. On 23 April insurgents stormed the Old Town Hall and seized cannon; the following day government forces fought at the Schwabentor and fired on the Martinstor. In March 1849 the revolutionaries Gustav Struve and Karl Blind appeared in a high-treason trial at the Basler Hof, where Wilhelm Liebknecht was tried and acquitted in May 1849.

=== Railway-era expansion, markets and architecture ===
Freiburg's first railway station opened to the west of the medieval centre in 1845. The subsequent development along the western edge of the Old City became part of the later Altstadt-Ring. Here the synagogue built for the re-established Jewish community was inaugurated on 23 September 1870, beside the square now called Platz der Alten Synagoge. It was one of the most important nineteenth-century buildings in the western extension, before its destruction in 1938.

The city's former defensive belt was also transformed into civic and residential space. On the west of the old town, architect Georg Jakob Schneider designed the neo-Gothic Colombischlössle for Countess Maria Antonia Gertrudis de Colombi; completed in 1861, it stands on the former Saint Louis bastion and is surrounded by Colombipark. The villa later housed municipal functions and, from 1947 to 1952, was the official seat of Baden's president Leo Wohleb.

On the northern side, Karlsplatz had long served as a military parade and fairground. The Upper Rhine industrial exhibition of 1887 took place there. Its former open space was subsequently substantially built over, with the Karlsbau complex of shops, hotel and parking facilities constructed beginning in 1968.

The southern part of Altstadt-Ring also developed municipal recreation facilities. The first Faulerbad, opened in 1869 as a cold-water river bath fed by the Dreisam, occupied a site by Faulerstraße; its later replacement became a distinctive work of late-twentieth-century architecture.

On 3 October 1876, Emperor Wilhelm I was honoured at a banquet in the Historisches Kaufhaus on Münsterplatz. The great hall subsequently became known as the Kaisersaal. In the same period, the market and retail landscape evolved: Münsterplatz, the older main market street and the growing western shopping and institutional quarter played distinct roles.

The writer, priest and Baden politician Heinrich Hansjakob served as parish priest at the former Franciscan church of St Martin on Rathausplatz from 1884 until 1913. He published historical and literary works during his tenure, including a history of the church.

The mayoralty of Otto Winterer (1888–1913) transformed the appearance of the central streets. Winterer supported enlargement and historicist remodelling of the medieval Martinstor and Schwabentor, restoration of the Bächle, new paving mosaics, fountains and street furniture, and investment in conspicuous public buildings. His administration was also responsible for the rapid transformation of the area's nineteenth-century streetscape; building regulations were updated in 1910. The gates, rather than representing untouched medieval structures, thus embody substantial early-twentieth-century additions. The new university building at the western edge of the Old City was another major project of the Winterer era.

In 1891 a girls' secondary school building opened at Holzmarkt, later associated with the Goethe-Gymnasium. The St. Ursula Gymnasium developed from the Ursuline teaching tradition formerly based at the Schwarzes Kloster on Rathausgasse; the school moved to Eisenbahnstraße 45 in 1893. Meanwhile, the building now known as the New Town Hall, formerly occupied by university teaching facilities, was remodelled for municipal administration in the late nineteenth century.

The archdiocesan administrative building at Herrenstraße 35 was constructed between 1903 and 1906 to designs by Raimund Jeblinger. The city's theatre building followed in 1910, and the university's Kollegiengebäude I in 1911, giving the western edge of the quarter the monumental academic and cultural ensemble visible today.

=== Twentieth century: intellectual life, National Socialism and war ===
The Russian poet Marina Tsvetaeva (also transliterated Marina Zwetajewa) lived in Freiburg as a young student in 1904–1905. She boarded at a school run by the Brink sisters at Wallstraße 10 in the Altstadt. A plaque on the building commemorates her residence.

The university's Kollegiengebäude I (KG I) opened in 1911 in the central Altstadt university district, and Kollegiengebäude II (KG II), containing the Auditorium Maximum, was built in 1957–1961 at the Platz der Alten Synagoge.

On 27 May 1933, Martin Heidegger delivered his rectoral address Die Selbstbehauptung der deutschen Universität in the university's main auditorium. The university's assembly hall was located in Kollegiengebäude I in the Old City. In this address he advocated a National Socialist reorientation of university life.

The Yugoslav law student Duško Popov, who later became a British double agent during the Second World War, lived at Gartenstraße 1 in the southern inner-city district while studying in Freiburg in the 1930s.

The National Socialist seizure of power changed the use of the Old City's civic spaces. On 10 May 1933, a newly reorganised municipal council met in the Historisches Kaufhaus and conferred honorary citizenship on Adolf Hitler, Paul von Hindenburg and Baden's Nazi governor Robert Wagner. An accompanying rally of Nazi organisations took place outside, on Münsterplatz.

In the basement of the Basler Hof, which had been requisitioned for police use, the Gestapo detained, abused and tortured political opponents between 1933 and 1941. This history is distinct from the building's earlier use as an imperial chancellor's palace and a lodging for the French king.

The resistance worker Gertrud Luckner was employed by the German Caritas Association, whose headquarters were at Werthmannstraße 4 in Altstadt-Ring. She helped people targeted by Nazi persecution, particularly Jews, and a plaque at the building commemorates her work there.

On the night of 9–10 November 1938, Nazi perpetrators burned the 1870 synagogue at the site of today's Platz der Alten Synagoge, in Altstadt-Ring. A memorial pool outlining the destroyed synagogue was installed on the square in 2017.

On 27 November 1944, the Royal Air Force bombing of Freiburg devastated large areas of the historic centre, particularly its northwestern section. The minster survived with comparatively limited damage despite the destruction around it. Postwar reconstruction was directed in part by architect and city planning official Joseph Schlippe, whose programme sought to preserve elements of Freiburg's older urban character while introducing arcades and modern buildings on the major streets. The subsequent rebuilding retained some street alignments while replacing much of the earlier building fabric. Konviktstraße, for example, had been badly damaged and was largely rebuilt in the early 1970s on a street plan recalling the medieval layout.

=== Postwar parliament, rebuilding and public events ===
After the war, the Kaisersaal of the Historisches Kaufhaus housed the consultative assembly for the postwar state of Baden from 1946; its state parliament subsequently met there until 1952. The 61 members of the constituent assembly, including three women, met in the Kaisersaal. On 21 April 1947 the assembly adopted the new constitution of Baden; it was subsequently approved in a referendum on 18 May 1947. The nearby Colombischlössle was used as the State Chancellery of postwar South Baden's government, making the Altstadt a seat of regional administration as well as parliamentary debate.

Reconstruction and traffic planning reshaped the Altstadt in the following decades. Conversion of its main shopping streets into pedestrian areas began in 1969. The pedestrian-zone order for Kaiser-Joseph-Straße came into force on 22 November 1973; trams continued to cross the centre. The city's Bächle system was integrated with the new pedestrian environment, particularly alongside Kaiser-Joseph-Straße and Bertoldstraße.

On 24 July 1967, the poet Paul Celan read his poetry in the university's Auditorium Maximum in Kollegiengebäude II, in Altstadt-Ring. Martin Heidegger attended; the two men met during Celan's Freiburg visit. The meeting became a significant episode in the reception of Celan's writing and Heidegger's philosophy.

The second half of the twentieth century brought several important conversions and new institutions: the Faulerbad at Faulerstraße 1 was rebuilt between 1980 and 1983 to designs by Hans-Dieter Hecker, replacing the demolished earlier pool; in 1983 the Colombischlössle became the permanent home of the archaeological museum. In 1987 the Jewish community inaugurated a new synagogue and community centre at Nußmannstraße 14 in Altstadt-Mitte, distinct from the 1870 synagogue destroyed in 1938.

The old university building on Bertoldstraße opened its Uniseum in 2004.

On 24 September 2011, Pope Benedict XVI addressed visitors at Münsterplatz and met seminarians in the chapel of the Collegium Borromaeum on Herrenstraße. On 25 September he delivered a separate address at the Konzerthaus Freiburg in Altstadt-Ring.

On 21 July 2015, the University Library reopened in its radically reconstructed glass-and-metal-clad building at Platz der Universität 2. The old-town cultural landscape changed further in March 2025 with the opening of the Documentation Centre for National Socialism in the former municipal tourist-office building dating from 1936 at Rotteckring 14. On 28 February 2026 the Augustiner Museum completed its multi-stage renovation with the reopening of the cloister, convent building and historic cellar areas.

== Architecture and landmarks ==
=== Münsterplatz, the market and the cathedral quarter ===
Freiburg Minster occupies the centre of Münsterplatz. Its main periods of construction extend from around 1200 to the early sixteenth century. Its high altar is by Hans Baldung; the stained-glass windows and sculpture preserve major medieval and Renaissance artistic programmes.

The market now known as the Münstermarkt is rooted in the 1120 market charter, but the use of the area directly around the minster as a market became possible only after the medieval churchyard and cemetery were relocated in the sixteenth century. The market continues on Münsterplatz. The Historisches Kaufhaus on its south side was constructed in 1520–1532 as a municipal trading, customs and financial building; its Kaisersaal later served political assemblies and concerts. The city market office continues to oversee the market from this historic building.

The Kornhaus (Münsterplatz 11) was intended to help accommodate the imperial diet of 1498 but was not ready for it. It later served as a guild and entertainment building and hosted professional theatrical performances between 1770 and 1824. Today it houses the Centre Culturel Français Freiburg, with French-language teaching and a Francophone media library.

Other major buildings around Münsterplatz include the Alte Wache, built in 1733 as a guardhouse and now occupied by the Haus der badischen Weine; the Wentzingerhaus, built by painter and sculptor Johann Christian Wentzinger in the 1760s at Münsterplatz 30 and the home of the Museum für Stadtgeschichte until its closure in late 2024; and the Haus zum Ritter (Münsterplatz 6). The last was built for the Breisgau knighthood in 1756, subsequently served the estates and the archbishop, and now accommodates the cathedral music school and its choirs in the former archiepiscopal palace.

=== Medieval streets, gates and civic buildings ===
The Martinstor and Schwabentor survive as the principal remnants of the medieval gate system. Both underwent historicist heightening and redesign around the turn of the twentieth century under Mayor Otto Winterer. The oldest civic buildings around Rathausplatz include the Old Town Hall, the New Town Hall (adapted from older university buildings) and the Gerichtslaube, an important site of the 1498 Imperial Diet.

Further historic buildings include the Basler Hof on Kaiser-Joseph-Straße, the Haus zum Walfisch on Franziskanerstraße, the Zum Roten Bären inn at Oberlinden, and the Renaissance and Baroque houses lining Salzstraße and Herrenstraße. Around the obere Altstadt, the narrow streets of Gerberau, Fischerau, Insel, Konviktstraße and Augustinerplatz preserve the old crafts quarter and its system of watercourses, although parts of the streetscape were reconstructed after the 1944 bombing.

=== Churches, religious institutions and schools ===
Religious buildings in the quarter include the minster; the former Franciscan church of St Martin on Rathausplatz; the University Church on Bertoldstraße; the church and former convent of Adelhausen; and the chapel of the Collegium Borromaeum (also called the Konviktskirche) on Herrenstraße. The former Ursuline convent and church of St Ursula at Rathausgasse 50, popularly the Schwarzes Kloster, now house the adult education centre and other institutions; the church is used by the Old Catholic congregation.

At the southern end of Herrenstraße, the nineteenth-century seminary, church and the early-twentieth-century Erzbischöfliches Ordinariat form a group of archdiocesan buildings. The administrative building at Herrenstraße 35 was built in 1903–1906 to plans by Raimund Jeblinger. The nearby St. Ursula Gymnasium at Eisenbahnstraße 45 and the Goethe-Gymnasium at Holzmarkt are historic educational institutions in the quarter.

=== Museums and university buildings ===
The Augustiner Museum occupies the former Augustinian hermits' monastery and church at Augustinerplatz; the municipal museum opened there in 1923. It holds medieval sculpture, paintings, historic stained glass and regional art collections. Its renovation proceeded in phases, including the House of Graphic Art (2016), and culminated in the full reopening on 28 February 2026. New galleries in the former convent now exhibit Freiburg's urban and cultural history, including collections formerly displayed at the Museum für Stadtgeschichte in the Wentzingerhaus.

The Museum für Neue Kunst at Marienstraße 10a opened in 1985 in a former girls' school building erected in 1902, focusing on modern and contemporary art. The Museum Natur und Mensch at Gerberau 32 holds collections of natural history and ethnology, while the Museum für Stadtgeschichte was formerly housed in the Wentzingerhaus at Münsterplatz 30. It closed there in late 2024, and the city's historical collections were integrated into the expanded Augustinermuseum in 2026.

The Archäologisches Museum Colombischlössle has occupied the neo-Gothic Colombischlössle, erected 1859–1861, since 1983. It displays archaeological finds from the region. The same western central-city quarter contains the municipal Dokumentationszentrum Nationalsozialismus at Rotteckring 14, which opened in 2025.

In the university area, Kollegiengebäude I (opened in 1911) and Kollegiengebäude II (1957–1961) stand beside the former Jesuit university buildings and the Uniseum on Bertoldstraße. The modern university library at Platz der Universität 2 reopened after a complete reconstruction in July 2015.

=== Colombipark, Karlsplatz and later development ===
The Colombischlössle and its park occupy the site of a former seventeenth-century bastion on the western edge of the medieval nucleus. The villa served the president of the postwar state of Baden from 1947 to 1952 and now houses the archaeological museum. Nearby on Rotteckring is the Colombi Hotel, which opened in the postwar period; despite its similar name, it is a separate building and not the Colombischlössle.

At the northern edge, the former parade and fairground at Karlsplatz was partially occupied by the commercial and hotel Karlsbau complex from 1968 onward. Around Unterlinden, the rebuilding of the former Dominican monastery area has continued through twentieth- and twenty-first-century urban redevelopment, with archaeological and architectural evidence of its older foundations documented during redevelopment of the BAKOLA site.

In the southern Altstadt-Ring, the Faulerbad at Faulerstraße 1 dates in its present form to 1980–1983 and was designed by Hans-Dieter Hecker. It replaced an earlier riverside swimming facility: Faulerbad and Karlsbau are separate sites, not successive uses of the same building.

== Education, theatre, cinema and cultural life ==
The Theater Freiburg opened its purpose-built theatre at Bertoldstraße in October 1910; the Konzerthaus Freiburg opened beside the railway approach in 1996. These venues, together with university buildings, churches and museums, are concentrated in Altstadt-Ring and the adjoining medieval core.

The Wallgraben-Theater was founded by students in 1953 in a former wine cellar and air-raid shelter off Wallstraße. Since 1973 it has operated from vaulted cellar rooms beneath the New Town Hall at Rathausgasse 5a, becoming one of Freiburg's established independent theatrical venues.

The Friedrichsbau-Lichtspiele are in the Friedrichsbau at Kaiser-Joseph-Straße 268–270, near the Martinstor. The cinema opened in April 1911; older historical records refer to the house as Kaiserstraße 150, reflecting an earlier form of the street address rather than the present numbering. It has subsequently been operated as an independent art-house cinema, with European and international film programmes.

Other established cultural institutions include the Freiburg cathedral choirs and music school, which rehearse in the former archiepiscopal palace at Münsterplatz 6; the Centre Culturel Français in the Kornhaus at Münsterplatz 11; the Uniseum in the Alte Universität; and, at Wallstraße 8 in Altstadt-Ring, the Tibet-Kailash-Haus, a centre for Tibetan Buddhist meditation and traditional Tibetan medicine.

The Markthalle Freiburg on Grünwälderstraße 4 is a covered food market, distinct from the historic open-air Münstermarkt around the minster. The streets around Oberlinden, Gerberau, Fischerau and Konviktstraße retain smaller shops, restaurants and cafés alongside cultural institutions.

=== People with documented sites in the Old City ===
The following connections are to identifiable buildings or events in Altstadt-Mitte or Altstadt-Ring; they do not imply that every scholar or celebrity associated with the wider city resided in the Old City:

- Erasmus — lived at the Haus zum Walfisch on Franziskanerstraße in 1529–1531 and subsequently at Schiffstraße 7 until 1535.
- Johann Christian Wentzinger — built and occupied the house at Münsterplatz 30, which housed the Museum für Stadtgeschichte until 2024.
- Johann Georg Jacobi — lived at Herrenstraße 43 from 1807 to 1814, now part of the Schwarzwälder Hof hotel.
- Karl von Rotteck — owned a house site at Rathausgasse 33, later the Rotteckhaus.
- Countess Maria Antonia Gertrudis de Colombi — commissioned and occupied the Colombischlössle in the 1860s.
- Marina Tsvetaeva — boarded at Wallstraße 10 in 1904–1905.
- Duško Popov — lived at Gartenstraße 1 while studying law in the 1930s.
- Heinrich Hansjakob — served at St Martin on Rathausplatz from 1884 to 1913.
- Gertrud Luckner — worked at the Caritas premises at Werthmannstraße 4 in Altstadt-Ring; this is a verified place of work, not a claim that she resided there.
- Ursel Bühring — the phytotherapist and medicinal-plant educator is listed as having had a practice at Kaiser-Joseph-Straße 280; this documents a professional Altstadt address, not a residential one.
- Leo Wohleb — used the Colombischlössle as the official residence of the president of Baden from 1947 to 1952.

== Shopping and transport ==
The Münsterplatz hosts the open-air Münstermarkt, while the principal shopping streets include Kaiser-Joseph-Straße, Rathausgasse and the lanes of the obere Altstadt. The covered Markthalle Freiburg operates at Grünwälderstraße 4; the Karlsbau on Karlsplatz and the redeveloped Unterlinden area are further retail and mixed-use sites inside the quarter. Much of the medieval centre is pedestrianised, although tramways remain in service on its main axes.

=== Tramways and local transport ===
The Freiburg tramway is operated by Freiburger Verkehrs AG (VAG). The following stops are situated in or immediately on the boundary of the Old City, and are served by the indicated number of regular daytime tram lines, according to the October 2026 route network and timetables (excluding special services and occasional extensions):

- Stadttheater — 5 lines: 1, 2, 3, 4 and 5.
- Bertoldsbrunnen — 4 lines: 1, 2, 3 and 4.
- Holzmarkt — 2 lines: 2 and 4.
- Europaplatz — 2 lines: 3 and 5.
- Oberlinden — 1 line: 1.
- Schwabentorbrücke — 1 line: 1.
- Erbprinzenstraße — 1 line: 5.
- Fahnenbergplatz — 1 line: 5.
- Hauptbahnhof (Stadtbahn) — 4 lines: 1, 2, 3 and 4; the tram stop is on the Stühlingerbrücke above the railway tracks, at the western boundary of the quarter, rather than within the medieval core.

Stadttheater is the only stop in this list served by all five regular tram lines; Bertoldsbrunnen is the principal interchange in the medieval centre. Some individual line 5 trips continue beyond their normal terminus to Bertoldsbrunnen, but line 5 is not counted among its regular through lines.

Hauptbahnhof is the nearest major railway interchange, providing a tram connection between the Old City and the citywide network.

=== Rail connections ===
Freiburg (Breisgau) Hauptbahnhof lies on the western edge of the Altstadt and is its principal mainline rail gateway, rather than a station within the medieval street network. The station is on the Mannheim–Karlsruhe–Basel railway and provides regional and long-distance services. In the 2026 timetable its direct international services include TGV trains to Paris-Est via Strasbourg, ICE trains to Chur via Basel and Zürich, and EuroCity Express (ECE) trains to Milano Centrale via Switzerland. These are connections from the station at the edge of the quarter, not train services running through the Altstadt itself; routes and operating days vary with the timetable.

== See also ==
- Freiburg Minster
- Historical Merchants' Hall (Freiburg)
- Freiburg Bächle
- Schwabentor
- Martinstor
