= Breisach Gate =

Building in Freiburg im Breisgau, Germany

Coordinates: 47°59′33″N 7°50′52″E

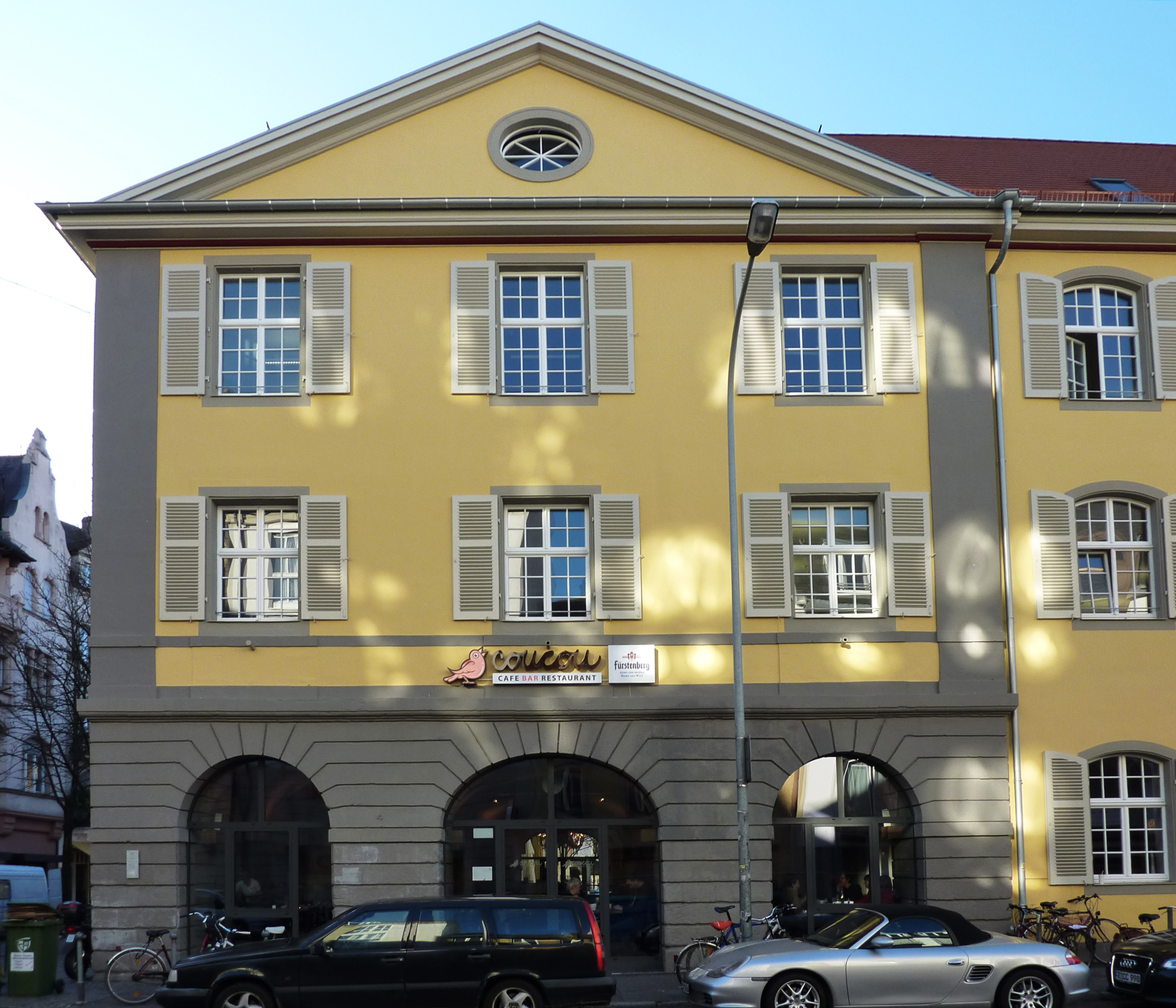
Breisacher Tor (2009)

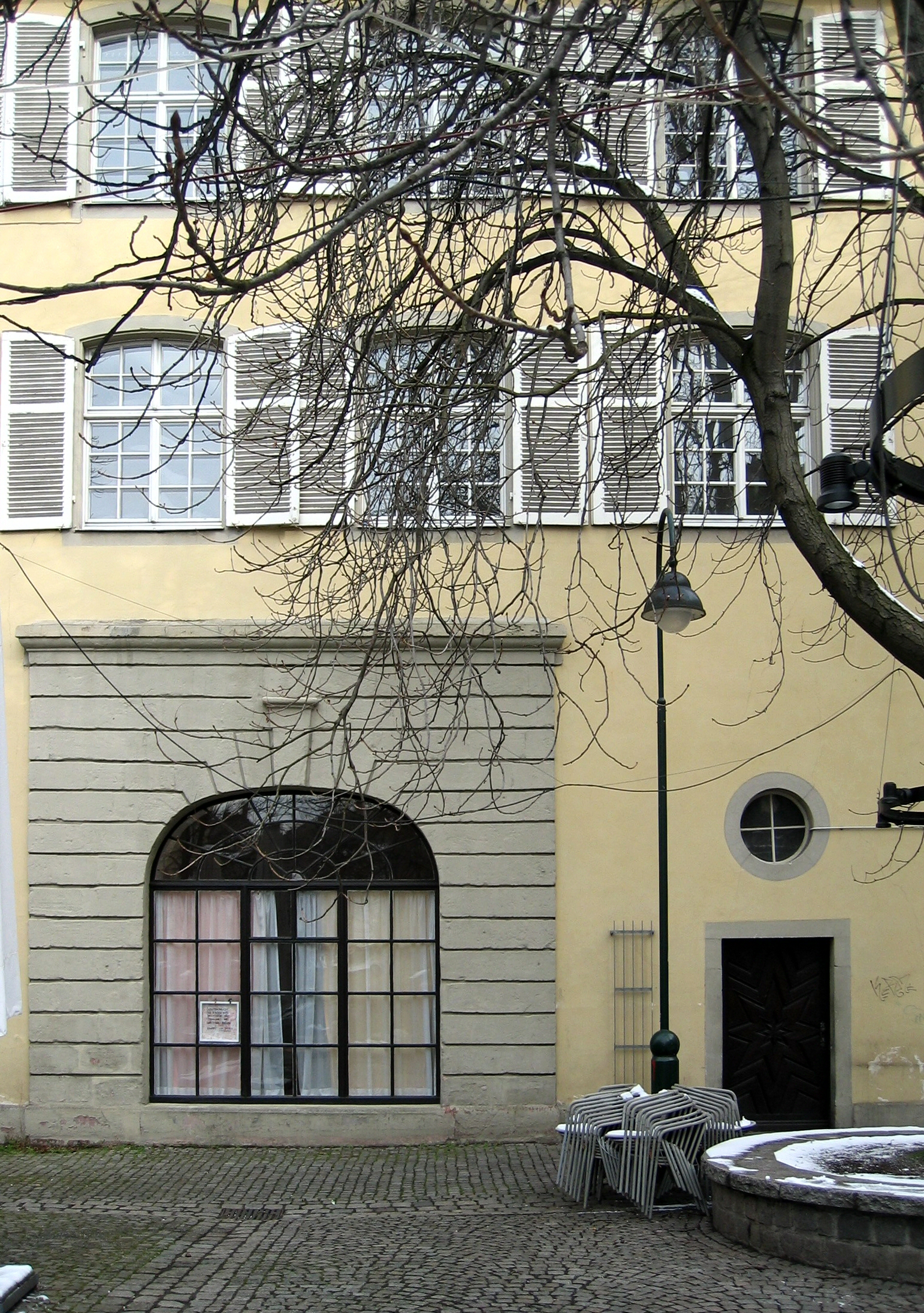
Back side of the former gateway

The Breisach Gate (German: Breisacher Tor) is a city gateway of Freiburg im Breisgau. It is located at the boundary of the old city at the crossing of Rempartstraβe and Gartenstraβe. The edifice was listed as a cultural monument of special significance in accordance with paragraph 12 of the Monument Protection Law.

== History ==
The gate is the only preserved edifice of the fortifications of Freiburg designed by Vauban in 1677 in the Baroque style. When the French troops slighted the fortifications during their withdrawal in 1745, it remained the only gate among the four original. It was called Porte Saint-Martin at the time - like the one in Paris, both built for Louis XIV - and was an emblematic gateway to the city. Later, the gate received the name Breisacher Tor because the traffic of the southern arterial road heading toward Breisach and Basel passed through it. Marie Antoinette, the younger daughter of Empress Maria Theresa and Emperor Francis I of the Austrian Empire came in the city through the Breisacher Tor on her wedding journey to the French royal court.

In the second half of 19th century a third floor was added to the original two-storey construction, when a triangular gable was added to the jutting out median risalit. The building was then used as a school. During the reshaping of Gartenstraße in the year 1903 the east wing was demolished, but you can still see the foundations demarcated with pavement.

== Application ==
The Breisacher Tor was seriously damaged during World War II and was restored in 1950/51 in the style of the late-19th-century. Initially it was used by an insurance company; subsequently until 2007 it housed administrative offices of the city of Freiburg. In 1989 the square behind the building was enhanced with trees and a Bächle. After the following sale to a private individual the whole building was renovated. While the University of Freiburg rents the upper floors where seminars and lectures are held, there is a restaurant on the ground floor of the central block of the gate that uses the square behind the building – the former access – as a terrace.

== Literature ==
- Peter Kalchthaler, Freiburg und seine Bauten. Ein kunsthistorischer Stadtrundgang. Freiburg 1991. ISBN 3-923288-12-3; Nr. 10: Breisacher Tor
