= Schloss Ebnet =

Coordinates: 47°59′14″N 07°54′06″E

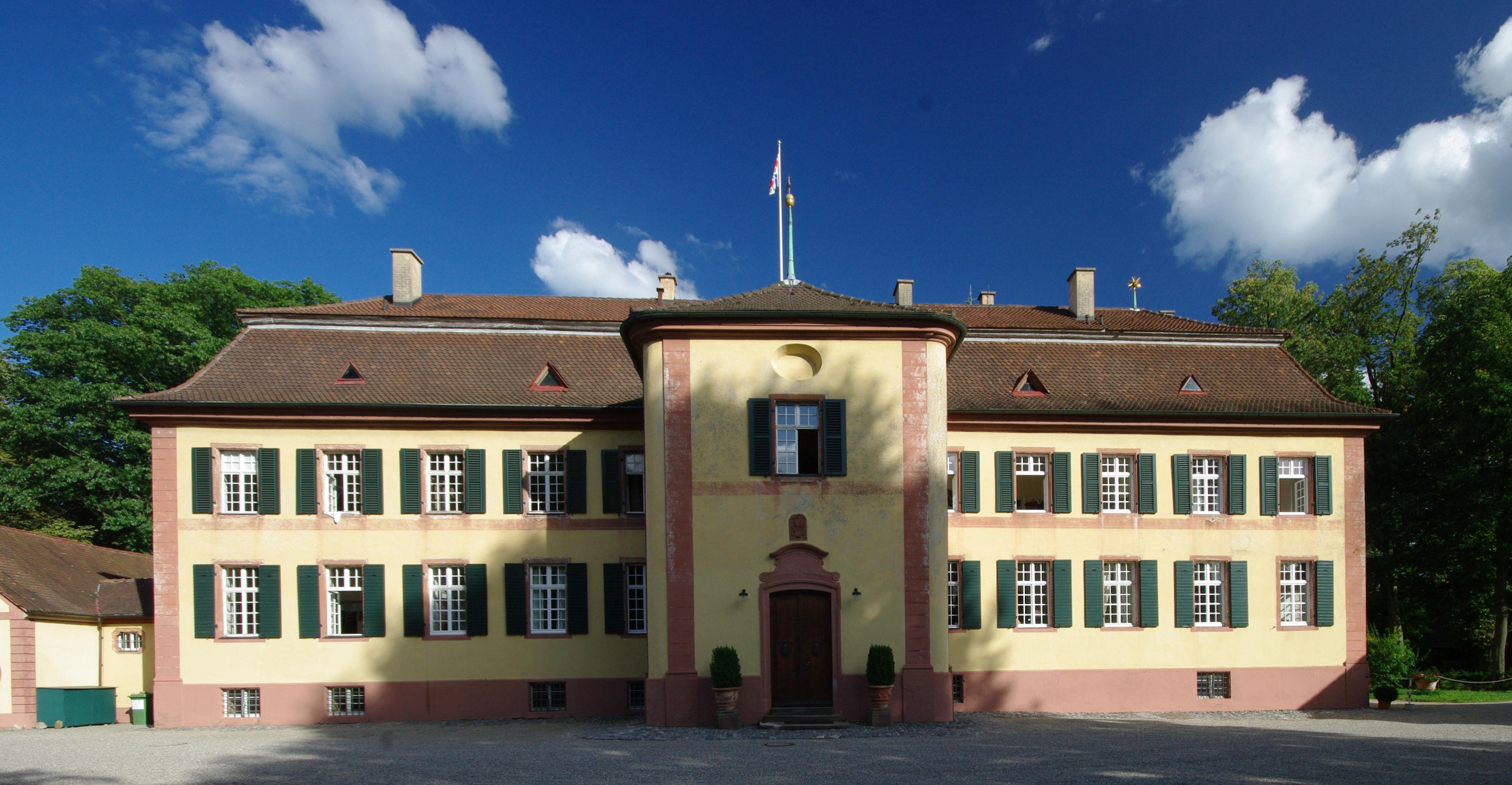
Main building

Schloss Ebnet is a baroque mansion in Ebnet, a district of Freiburg im Breisgau.

== History ==
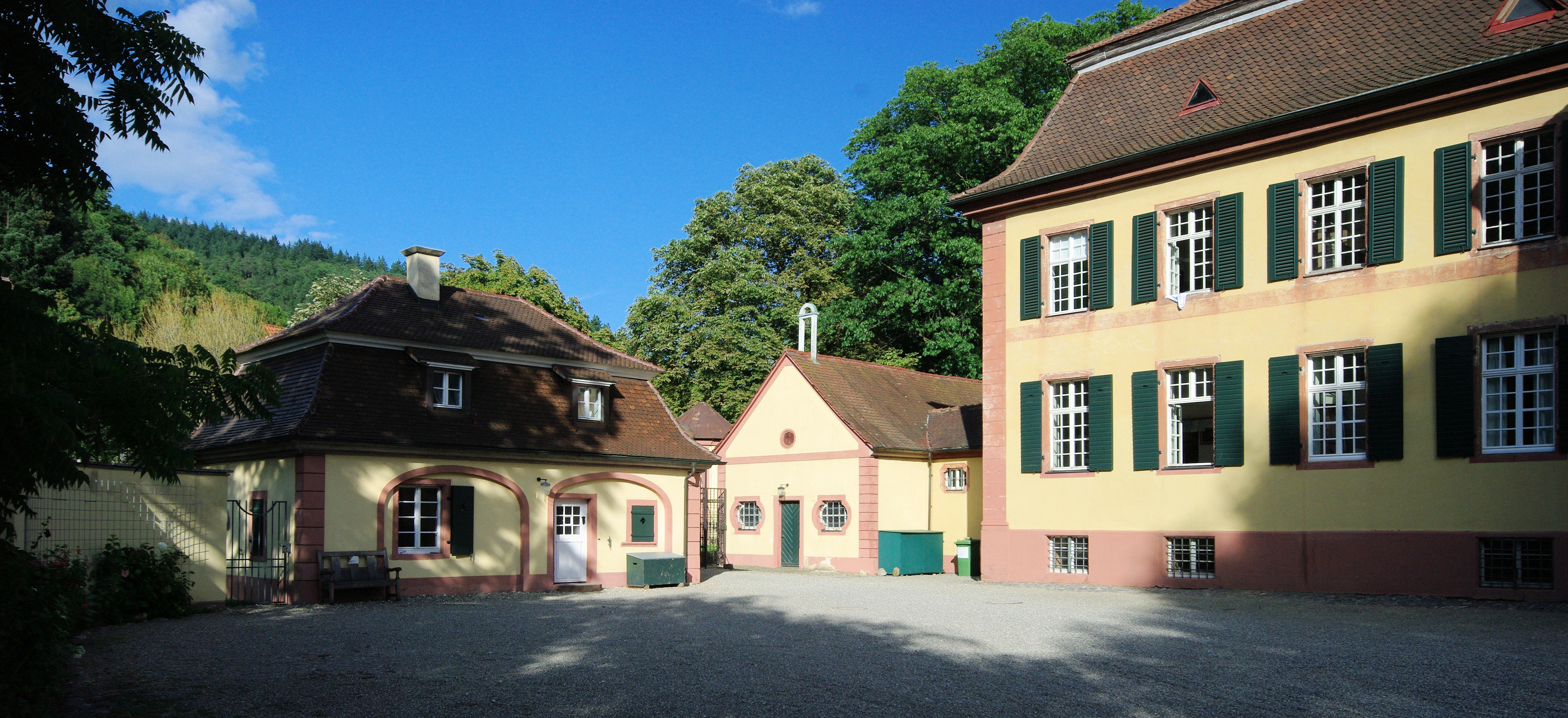
Farm building, chapel and main building

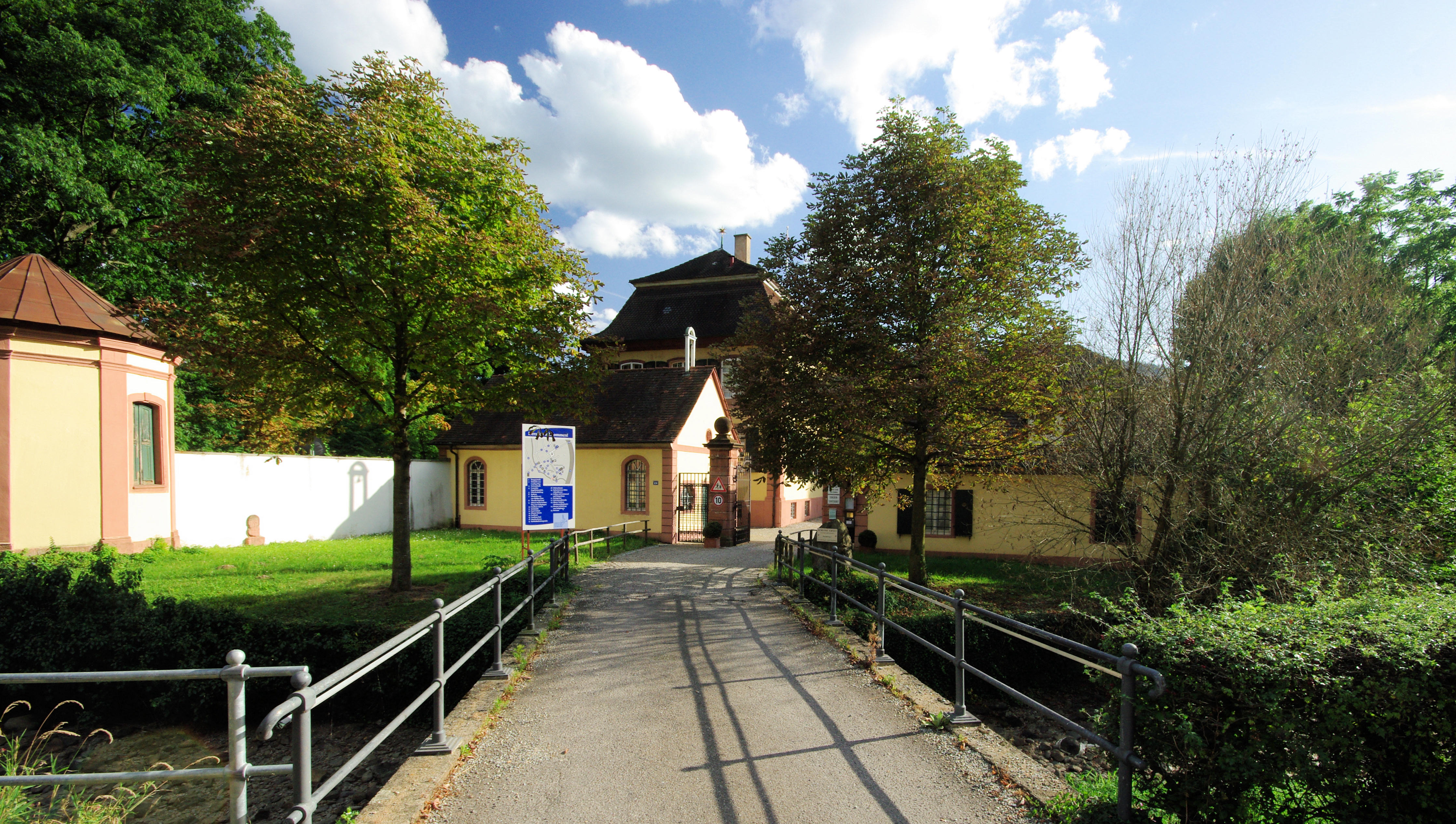
Driveway and gate, with the chapel behind it

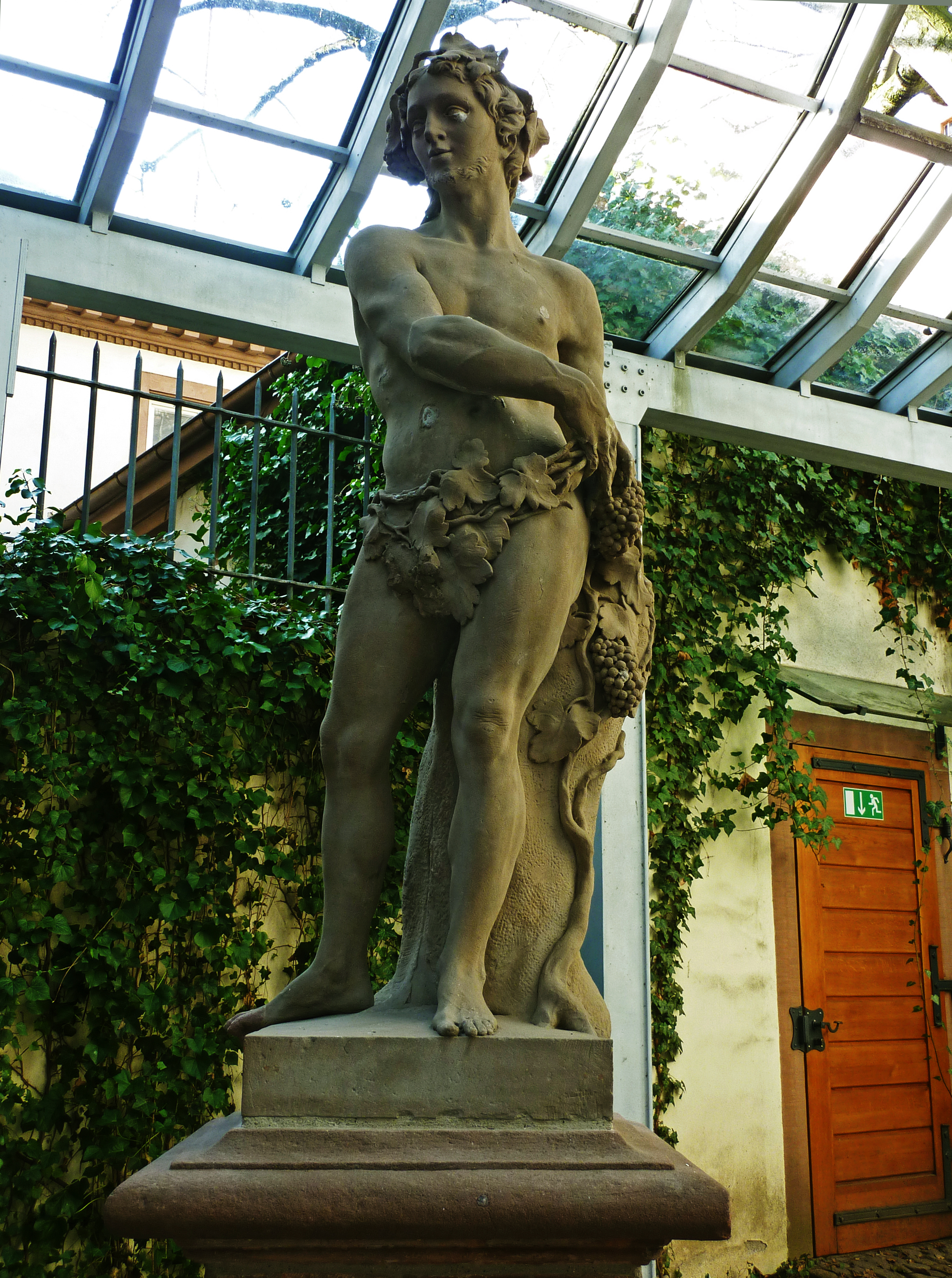
Der Herbst (J. C. Wentzinger)

Earlier than 1113 the Abbey of Saint Peter in the Black Forest acquired property in Ebnet from Duke Berthold of Zähringen through an exchange of property. Around 1348, a knight Schnewlin von Landeck, a member of an influential family in Breisgau, is referred to as the lord of Ebnet. Ebnet came into the possession of the Barons of Sickingen, a Baden noble family, in 1568 through the marriage of Anna von Landeck, the last representative of the Schnewlin von Landeck family.

They had a manor house built in Ebnet in 1696 on the site of a moated castle and used it as a summer residence. Their city palace in Freiburg is today the seat of the Freiburg District Court. In 1804, the barons' land was transferred with the Breisgau to the Baden state, to which the Sickingen family also sold the palace in 1809. The grandson of Grand Duke Charles sold it in 1811 to the barons of Gayling von Altheim, who still live in it today.

The mansion was built from 1748 onwards by order of Baron Ferdinand Sebastian von Sickingen-Hohenburg according to a design by the architect Johann Jacob Fechter from Basel because the previous building no longer met the client's requirements. Important Baroque artists from the region were consulted for the artistic decoration, in particular Christian Wentzinger, who created the human-sized sandstone sculptures in the palace park, the originals of which are now in the Museum of City History Freiburg. The stucco work in the 14 rooms of the palace was created by Wessobrunner stucco-worker Hans Georg Gigl, the richly decorated stucco masks in the garden hall by Wentzinger. The ceiling paintings, especially in the garden hall, are mainly allegorical, painted in 1750 by the Allgäu artist Benedikt Gambs. The ceiling of the garden hall is signed by the artist. After Gamb's death, the ceiling painting of the magnificent staircase was created by Johann Pfunner (*around 1713/16 - †1788), who came from Tyrol and lived in Freiburg.

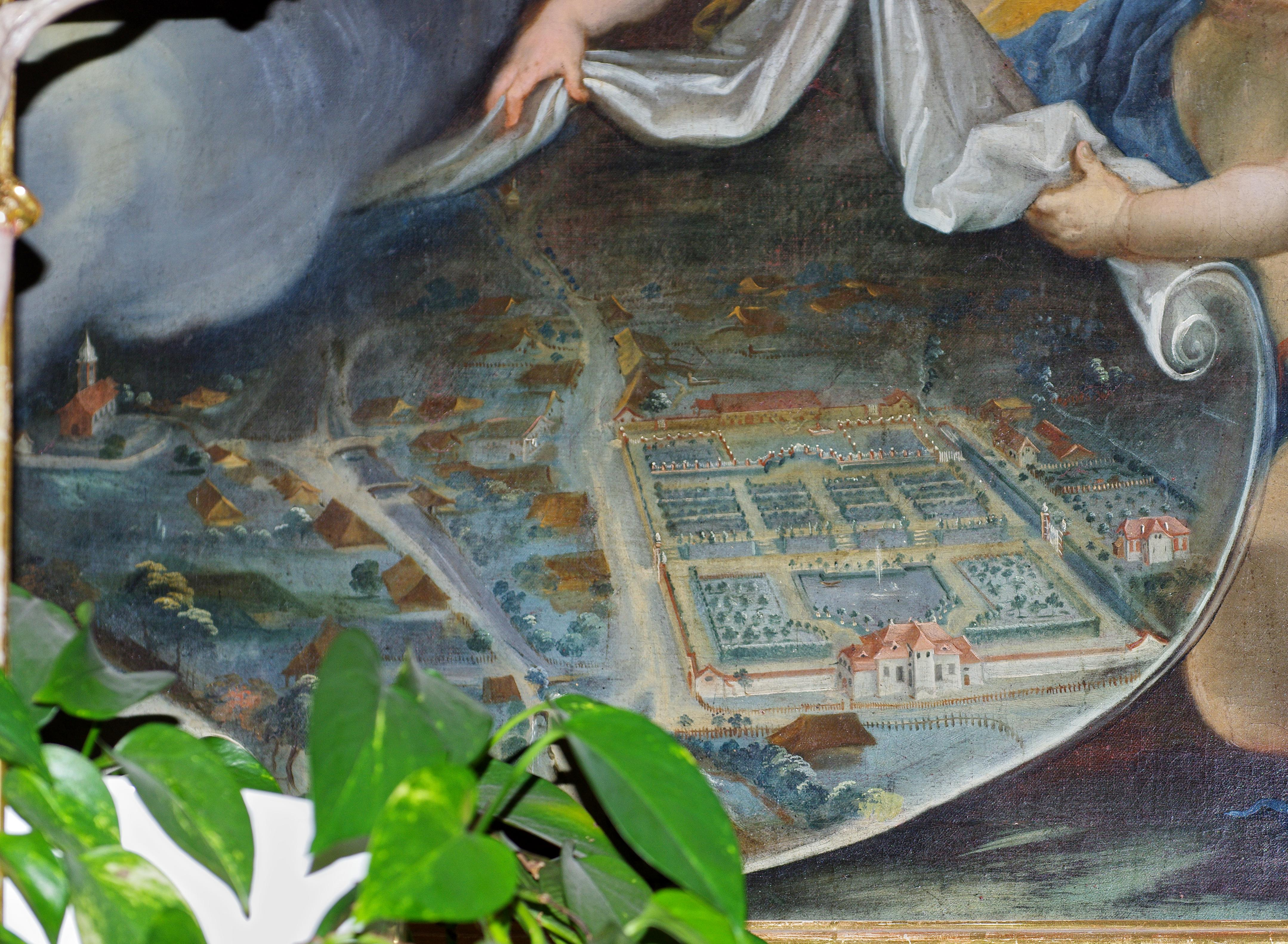
Picture of the town and castle around 1730, altarpiece in the church

The appearance before the remodeling is documented on the high altarpiece in the Ebnet parish church St. Hilarius. The picture was painted in 1730 by Franz Bernhard Altenburger. It shows Hilarius and the second patron saint of the church, St. Remigius, as they lower God's gifts of grace onto Ebnet, whose local view angel children unroll. The earlier appearance of the village and the castle can be seen in this view of the village.

During the Second World War, the castle was not bombed, but the Volkssturm blew up the Eschbach bridge in front of the castle, causing considerable damage. Numerous windows and parts of the roof were broken. The worst hit was the ceiling painting in the garden hall, which was later restored.

During the war, up to 100 refugees from the Ruhr area, Ludwigshafen, Freiburg and the surrounding area were housed in the castle and its outbuildings. The later Minister of Culture of Bavaria, Hans Maier, also spent the bombing night of November 27, 1944 in the cellar of Ebnet castle. The last refugees did not leave the property until 1950/51. The kitchen was originally located in the cellar and was moved to the first floor in 1958. The castle also served as one of the locations for the 1958 music and local history film Schwarzwälder Kirsch.

The castle was extensively restored in the 1980s. The Theodor Egel Hall, which now serves as a rehearsal room for the Freiburg Bach Choir, was built in the castle park in place of a coach house. Today, the castle is only open to the public for special cultural events such as the Ebneter Kultursommer or on Open Monument Day.

In 1991/92, the historic riding hall with a riding arena measuring 20 × 40 meters, which had been dismantled at the Rosenstiel riding club in Littenweiler, was rebuilt true to the original in Ebneter Schlosspark. The riding hall houses the Holzingstube, named after Max Freiherr von Holzing-Berstett (1867 to 1936). Holzing-Berstett was a dressage rider and played a key role in the international dressage rules that apply today. Since 2006, the "Storchenschule Ebnet" has also been housed in the parlor, where information about the life of the animals is permanently presented.

== Construction ==
The castle complex belongs to the "Hôtel entre Cour et Jardin" type - palace between courtyard and garden. The group of buildings consists of four parts: the gatehouse, the farm building opposite it, the chapel and the main building, which are grouped around a spacious courtyard. The main façade faces the garden. A projecting central gable is adorned with the family's magnificent coat of arms and is further emphasized by the balcony and the double flight of steps. The head of construction was Simon Schratt (1714-1781) from Altstätten in Oberallgäu. At the other end of the garden are the outbuildings such as stables, sheds and barns.

In order to renovate and preserve the castle (expected costs of at least two million euros), the owners planned to build a holiday home resort in the riding hall and barn in 2018 and a restaurant in the castle's vaulted cellar. The Deutsche Stiftung Denkmalschutz is providing 100,000 euros for the roof renovation in 2020.

== Palace chapel ==
At the entrance on the left, opposite the gatehouse, is the Chapel of the Holy Cross. It was built in 1732, before the castle was built, and then became part of the castle complex. It was connected to the north wing of the castle during renovation work around 1748 and served as a place of worship and prayer for the castle's lords. From 1811 it was used as the castle kitchen, having already been stripped of its furnishings. After the castle kitchen was moved back into the main building, the chapel was renovated and used as a place of worship by the Dreisamtal Protestant community from 1958. From 1979 to 1984, it was the church of the Orthodox congregation of "St. John the Baptist". After renewed profanation and subsequent restoration, the Freiherrlich Gayling von Altenheimsche Gesamtarchiv was housed here. After the archive was taken over by the Freiburg State archive, the chapel was restored to its original purpose as the Sickingen-Kapelle on October 29, 2017. However, it is now open to all faiths at the request of the landlord. A new bell was also cast.

== Literature ==
- Freiherrlich Gayling von Altheim'sches Gesamtarchiv Schloss Ebnet (ed.): Barockschloss Ebnet bei Freiburg i. Br. Verlag Schnell und Steiner, Munich and Zurich 1989, ISBN 3-7954-0468-1
- Paul-René Zander: Das Rokokoschloss Ebnet bei Freiburg i. Br. (= Schnell Kunstführer no. 2256). Verlag Schnell & Steiner, Regensburg 1997, ISBN 3-7954-6007-7
- Silvia Huth, Manfred Frust: Schlösser am Oberrhein. History and Stories. Silberburg-Verlag, Tübingen 2008, ISBN 978-3-87407-793-4, p. 126 ff.
