= Platz der Alten Synagoge =

Square in Freiburg im Breisgau, Germany

Coordinates: 47.9949°N 7.8462°E

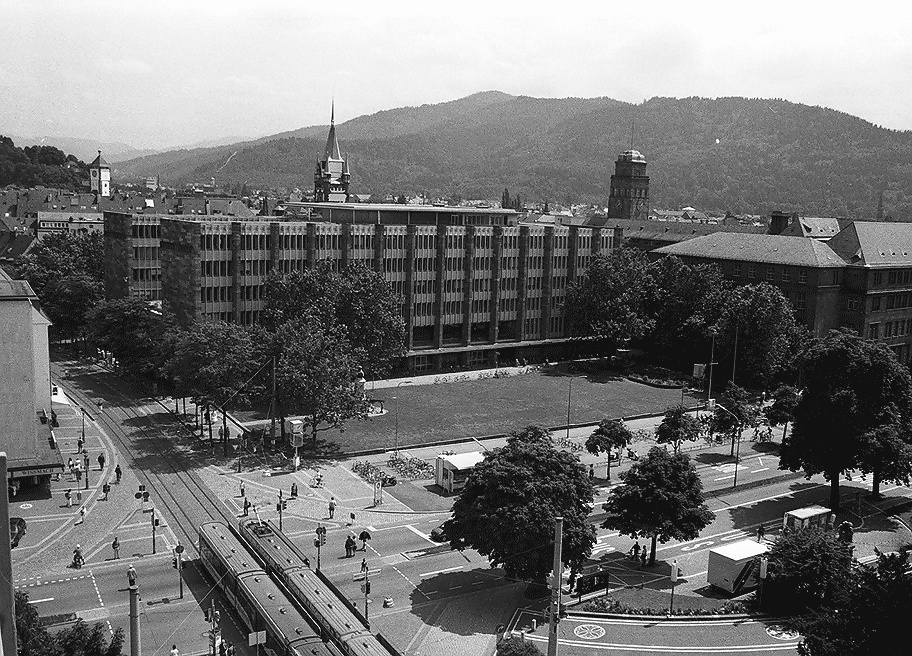
To the east of Platz der Alten Synagoge (in the picture behind it), on which the synagogue was built. Kollegiengebäude II was built during the early 1960s.

The Platz der Alten Synagoge (Old Synagogue Square) is a square in Freiburg, Germany. With a size of 130 by 130 metres (430 ft × 430 ft), it is the second largest square in the city after Minster Square. The square is named after the old synagogue, which was destroyed during the Kristallnacht in 1938. The synagogue had been built in 1869/1870 to the southwest of today's location of the square.

The Stadttheater and the Kollegiengebäude II of the University of Freiburg are located on the square. To the south on Sedanstraße is the Platz der Universität, where the Kollegiengebäude I and the University Library are located.

From 1927 to 1939 and after 1945 until the 1980s, the entire area between Bertold Straße and Belfort Straße was named Werthmannplatz until the former synagogue site became Europaplatz. The Platz der Universität has been so called since 2007.

During the Rotteckring project, the square was redesigned in 2016. On the north–south axis, the street crossing to the inner city centre has been replaced by tram tracks and the previous lawn area replaced by continuous pavement. The newly designed square opened on 2 August 2017.

== History ==
=== Bastions, Ramparts and Rempartstraße ===
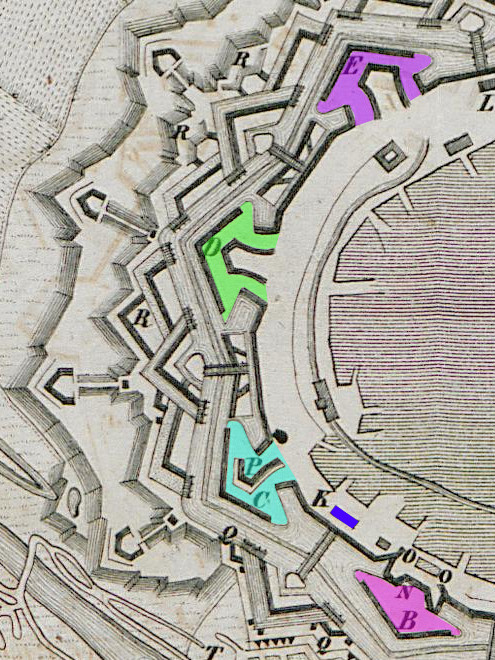
Details from the Siege Plan of 1744 (today's buildings in brackets): Bastei St. Josef (Colombischlössle) Bastei St. Leopold (Stadttheater)

In the 17th century, Freiburg was extended by Sébastien Le Prestre de Vauban to a fortress on behalf of the French King Louis XIV. In the area of today's square were the Bastion Dauphin (later Bastei St. Leopold) and a rampart, which connected them with the Bastion de la Reyne (later Bastei Kaiserin) and her subsequent successor Kaiser-Bastei. At the last two's locations, there is now a University Mensa and Holzmarkt.

Until their departure on 29 April 1745, as a result of the Treaty of Füssen, the French blew up the bulk of their fortifications, but used the remaining Earthworks (archaeology) as shelters. In spite of doubling the number of inhabitants during the following decades, it was not until 1845 that Freiburg's train station, which had been built outside the old part of the city, was opened. The railway line from Offenburg, which ended there, led to a western extension of the city beyond its former fortifications. The design developed by Josephy Roesch, was approved by the Upper Rhine government on 29 March 1846, opening the way for new roads to the Wiehre village as well as between the station and the old town.

After 1863, Ludwig Klehe, owner of the Hammerwerk Gaggenau, built a mansion on Bertholdstraße and later Rempartstraße on the site of the former Leopold Bastei, where Heinrich von Stein also lived in 1869.

The Israelitische Religionsgesellschaft, also founded in 1863, acquired the later site at Rempartstraße 15 at the end of the decade, to build a synagogue there. Since the mayor's office had planned to abolish the rampart and convert it into a road, the community undertook necessary construction measures to carry out the building of the new synagogue, such as embankments and stairs. In the autumn of 1869, the synagogue was built within a year by plans laid out by Georg Jakob Schneider, who had already designed plans for the Colombischlössle (1859/1860), whose location was the Bastion Saint Louis.

The building to the south of the synagogue was built in 1777/1778 or 1781 as a former garrison court in the place of the "Fauler Pelz" house and was converted into a breeding house at the start of the 19th century. In 1868, before the later correctional facility was completed, it became the Rampart barracks.

In keeping with the name of the barracks, Rempartstraße was constructed as far back as 1866 from parts of the rampart, which was first included in address books across Freiburg from as early as 1810. However, the majority of Rempartstraße was located in the Breisacher Tor area, the other part of which was integrated into the new Gardenstraße. At the same time, Bertholdstraße was named after the Jesuitengasse and the former use of high schools and the university. The continuation of Rempartstraße on the opposite side of Bertholdstraße was called Rotteckstraße from 1865. From 1867, the area, like the rest of the city, was given house numbers starting from the top of the street, instead of the numbering that had previously taken place across four city districts.

=== Werderstraße ===
Aided by the economic upturn after the founding of the German Reich and the Franco-Prussian War of 1870-1871, several streets were built to the west of Rempartstraße, a name still existing today. They were named after the Siege of Belfort, the Battle of Sedan, General Field Marshall Helmuth von Moltke and the German Kaiser Wilhelm I. Rempartstraße itself became part of Werderstraße. This street, named after the Prussian general August von Werder, was built in 1876 to link the Gartenstraße bridge (later replaced by Friedrich's Bridge and Kronen Bridge) with Berholdstraße, which replaced a wooden bridge over the Dreisam in 1869. A memorial to the General also has been reminiscent of the former Villa Klehe since 1874. It was acquired by Wilhelm August Platenius around 1873, the first board of the Deutsche Bank, founded in 1870. In addition, the Werderstraße, more precisely the Alleegarten on the site of the former Bastei Kaiserin, was one of the discarded potential sites for the Siegesdenkmal unveiled in 1876, with whom, in addition to the XIV Corps, Werder was also honoured as its leader.

From 1872 to 1874, the Oberrealschule, later known as the Rotteck-Gymnasium, was built next to the Villa Platenius and Sedanstraße in accordance with plans developed by Heinrich Lang.

== Recent Changes ==
In 2000, the artist group Büro für ungewöhnliche Maßnahmen arranged a yellow signpost resembling a traffic sign, showing the inscription “Gurs 1027 km.“ The memorial was authorized by the city administration only after it was hung up and it is a reminder of the Jewish people that were deported in 1940 as part of the Wagner-Bürckel-Aktion. Among them were more than 400 people from or near Freiburg. A tile explanations supplemented the sign. In other Baden and Palatine cities, there are comparable Gurs-memorials, for instance in Mannheim, Bruchsal or Ludwigshafen.

=== Plans for restructuring ===
At the end of 2004, the city administration of Freiburg organized a two-day Planungswerkstatt Platz der Alten Synagoge (planning workshop for the Old Synagogue Square). The purpose of this workshop was developing suggestions and concepts for a reconstruction, as well as coming up with ideas for future utilization. On March 21, 2006, the local council of Freiburg proposed the reconstruction of the Old Synagogue Square and called for proposals for the new design. The participants were asked to come up with concepts for the urban development, but also to think about a way of capturing “the topic ’Old Synagogue‘ in a draft with creative and artistic means.“ With this, the “memory and information of the Old Synagogue as well as the former and respectively present life of the Jewish community in the city“ was to be considered.“ and “The concept of the area of the Old Synagogue should harbor a calm atmosphere. At the same time it should represent a place of getting together (Knesset).“

The chosen draft of architects Volker Rosenstiel and Matin Schedlbauer was modified multiple times in the following years. The square was intended to remain as a wide open space between the theatre and the university. The second biggest square in the city was said to no longer be experienced as such, because it was divided by a traffic ring. This is why it was decided that the square should regain its old function of connecting the theater and the university. The city council argued that a reconstruction to connect the former street to the theatre's courtyard had, therefore, become necessary. The existing monument was supposed to remain. Furthermore, a water basin of the size, outline, and exact location of the old synagogue was meant to serve as a memorial.

In the spring of 2006 the university's building authorities, as a representative of the state of Baden-Württemberg, also initiated a contest in order to reconstruct the university library. The almost completely new constructed library, based on a winning draft by the Basler architectural office Deglo Architekten, was opened in October 2017. In 2007, on the occasion of the university's anniversary, the remaining part of the Werthmannplatz was renamed Platz der Universität (University Square). In order to keep honoring Werthmann with a street name, the Werderring was renamed Werthmannstraße.”

=== Modifications ===
As part of the project Stadtbahn und Umgestaltung am Rotteckring (Tram and Redesign of Rotteckring), the construction work started in 2012 and is supposed to be finished by 2018. In a local council sitting of 2013 further changes of the plan were discussed and immediately criticised by members of the professional association of architects. After previous changes of the plan in 2010, further changes were made. Instead of rebuilding the theatre courtyard the city introduced plans for urban gardening there. The rebuilding officially began in 2016. Shortly afterwards new tram tracks were built and connected to previously existing ones. Other tracks are in construction, however, the drafts had to be changed due to interference with an already existing tram station. The landmark Rotteckring is being stored in a warehouse during construction. Another landmark, die Liegende, previously to be found on the Old Synagogue Square, has been positioned in one of the buildings of the Albert-Ludwigs-Universität Freiburg. A memorial plaque for the destroyed synagogue has been placed at the newly installed fountain where the synagogue used to be.

In September 2016, remains of the synagogue's foundation were found during the earthworks for the synagogue-shaped fountain. This was followed by a public debate about whether or not to change plans in order to visibly preserve the stones. The debate was ended by a local council order on November 15, 2016, and the remaining fragments were covered with geotextile and filled with soil in order to prepare the foundation of the fountain. By the beginning of November some of the exposed stones had already been removed. A decision on what to do with the remaining stones was to be made by the spring of 2018. For that purpose 40,000 Euros had been granted over a period of two years.

A water chamber was installed in the subsoil. In March 2017, a plane tree was planted on the square (because one was damaged and chopped down during the construction works), as well as nine honey locusts. They received a subterrestrial irrigation system. Originally, it was planned to plant Spaeth's alder trees (Alnus spaethii), which unfortunately bore a too high allergy risk. Since the construction works were faster than anticipated, the square was inaugurated three months earlier than planned, on August 2., 2017. Among the 3,000 granite plates, which come from a quarry in the Bavarian Forest National Park, 12 water nozzles are installed on the square, which emit 1,5m high water fountains. The wooden platforms surrounding the big trees were not originally planned

Because the former meadow, surrounded by sandstone walls, was half a meter (about 20 inches) above the surrounding streets, the roots of the trees are now above the level of the square. The square is ‘’the biggest uncommercial seating area in the city center,’’ says the leader of the Garten- und Tiefbauamt Frank Uekermann. The square can withstand up to 30,000 kilograms. However, the problem posed by the lack of parking spots for bicycles has still not been solved yet. The costs for the reconstruction did not exceed 9,4 million euros. Around the end of July, test runs of the memorial fountain, which showed a completely flat, mirror-like surface, were started.

Big granite tiles are still missing on the south side of the square, because it interferes with the access road to the Platz der Weissen Rose, which is used to access the construction site of the second main building of the Albert-Ludwig University. In 2019, there will be an access road between the synagogue fountain and the university's first main building to the "Platz der weißen Rose" for the construction site by the second main building of the Albert-Ludwig University. Only after the renovations are done will the tiles be placed.

When the Gurs memorial with an explanatory sign was to be put back onto the square there were disagreements about its location: The city administration wanted it to be placed on the south-west corner of the square, close to the memorial fountain, others preferred its old location on the Bertoldstrasse. At the end of March it was attached to a lamppost west of the memorial fountain and the explanatory sign was embedded in a stone tile underneath it.

As of November 2017 two boards which inform about the former synagogue and request an appropriate behaviour were placed next to the memorial fountain, since people had been using it as a paddling pool.

=== Debate on the square's name ===
In 2016 the historian Bernd Martin, chairman of the Kommission zur Überprüfung der Freiburger Straßennamen, suggested to change the square's name from Platz der Alten Synagoge (Old Synagogue Square) to Platz der Zerstörten Synagoge (Square of the Destroyed Synagogue). His idea was supported by Freiburg's mayor Dieter Salomon.

About a year later, the SPD fraction of the city council submitted a corresponding request to the mayor. In their opinion, the name Old Synagogue Square hides the fact that the synagogue was destroyed by the National Socialists with the intention to annihilate Freiburg's Jewish community.

In contrast, however, the Jewish community opposed the renaming. On 18 September 2017, the city council dropped the renaming request.
