= Johann Christian Wentzinger =

German artist (1710–1797)

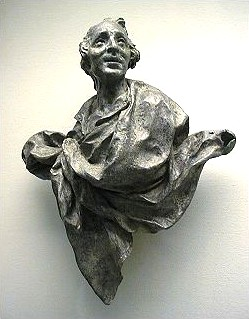
- Lead cast by Wentzinger
- Born: 1710
- Died: 1797 (aged 86–87); Freiburg
- Occupation: painter
- Style: Rococo

Johann Christian Wentzinger (1710–1797) was a southern German sculptor, painter, and architect of the Rococo period who worked mainly in the Breisgau.

== Work ==
Wentzinger worked in particular as a sculptor and painter, according to his own statement he was also as an architect. In any case, he was considered by his contemporaries to be a "Bauweiser" artist, whose opinion was sought after for municipal and private buildings.

Wentzinger's contributions to the decoration of the collegiate church of St. Gall, whose decoration he directed from 1757-1760, are to be considered his main works: larger-than-life statues on the exterior, ceiling and dome frescoes in the church interior, stucco ornamentation, allegorical and scenic reliefs. He had already carried out an extensive decoration program in Ebnet Castle near Freiburg in 1748. There he also created garden sculptures (Four Seasons - originals in the Wentzingerhaus since 1992) and stuccowork. The garden staircase designed by the castle's architect Johann Jakob Fechter was modified according to Wentzinger's design.Wentzinger's works are kept in the Augustinermuseum in Freiburg. The Mount of Olives group from Staufen is now in the collection of Liebieghaus in Frankfurt am Main.
