= University Church, Freiburg =

Church at the University of Freiburg

Coordinates: 47°59′43″N 7°50′52″E

The University Church, or Universitätskirche, is a Catholic church at the University of Freiburg. Located on Bertoldstrasse amongst the university buildings, the former Jesuit church (Jesuitenkirche) has been part of the university since the 18th Century.

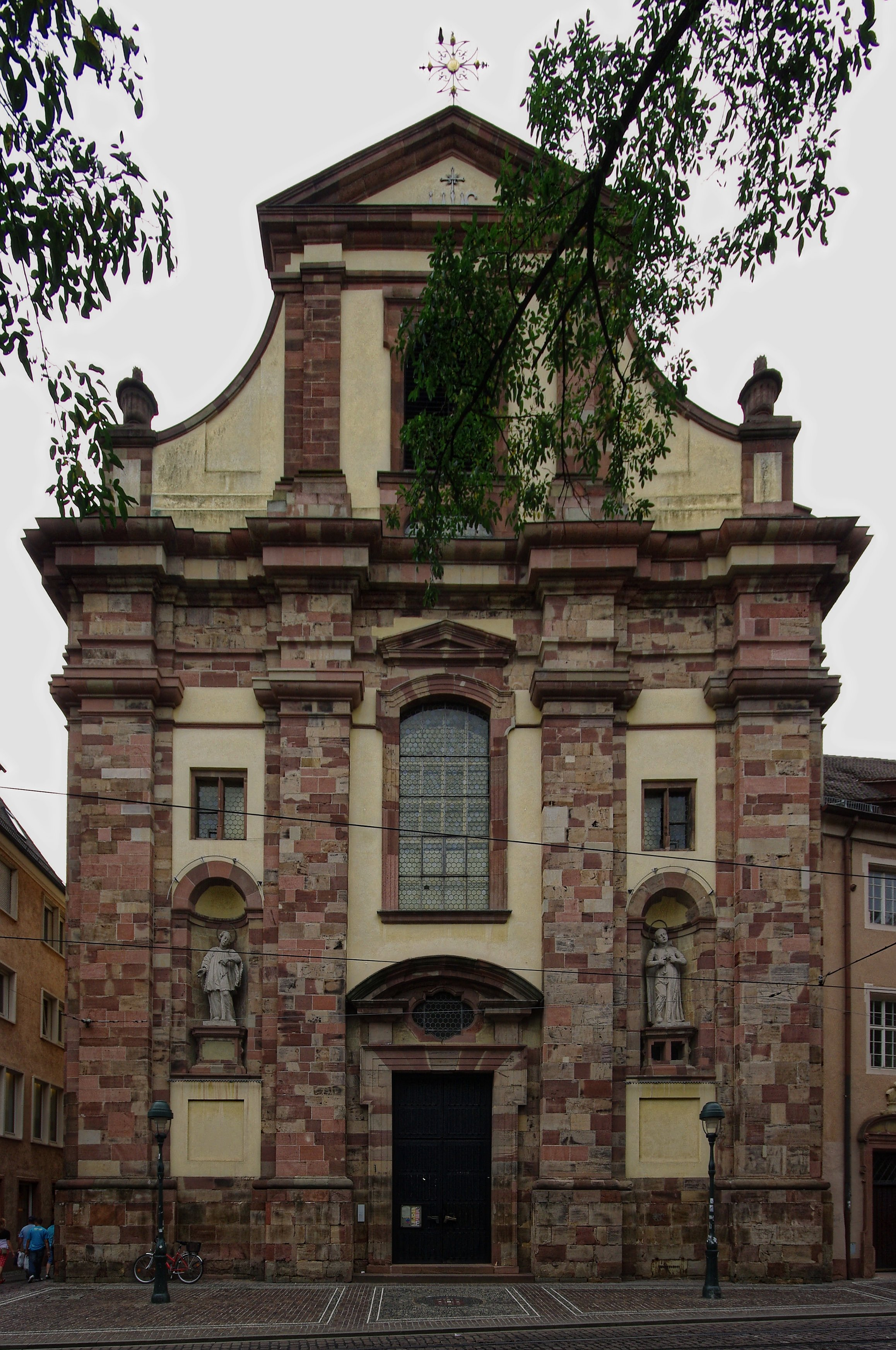
University Church.

== History ==
The church was built between 1683 and 1701 according to the plans of the Jesuit architect Heinrich Mayer and was dedicated to the Immaculate Conception of the Virgin Mary. The statues to the left and right of the main portal depict Saint Aloysius Gonzaga and Saint Stanislaus Kostka.

After the abolition of the Society of Jesus (1773), the order and its buildings came into the university's possession in 1793. When the Archdiocese of Freiburg was created in 1827, the first archbishop, Bernard Boll, was ordained in this church.

During the Second World War, the church was severely damaged in the air raid on Freiburg on 27 November 1944. The roof and vaulting collapsed, while the high altar and most of the Baroque interior furnishings were destroyed by fire. Following temporary stabilization measures, the building was reconstructed in 1956–1957. During the restoration, the vaults were rebuilt in reinforced concrete, surviving Baroque stucco decoration was conserved, and the interior was redesigned in a simplified form, as the original chancel could not be fully recreated. A further restoration, completed in 1978, sought to recover the church's original Baroque appearance through the restoration of its white stucco surfaces and dark wooden fittings in accordance with contemporary conservation principles.

== The Church Today ==
Today the church provides divine service for the community of the university. The church's organ and quality acoustics also ensure a high demand for its use as a concert venue, particularly for university organizations.

In addition to serving the Catholic university community, the church is home to the Katholische Hochschulgemeinde Edith Stein (Catholic University Community Edith Stein). The interior contains several notable post-war works of art, including a monumental wooden figure of the Crucified Christ by sculptor Franz Gutmann, installed in the chancel in 1988, and a Marian statue by Otto Herbert Hajek in one of the side chapels. Owing to its acoustics and historic organ, the church regularly hosts concerts, organ recitals and university ceremonies in addition to liturgical services.

== See also ==
- List of Jesuit sites
