= Konzerthaus Freiburg =

Concert hall in Freiburg im Breisgau, Germany

Freiburg Konzerthaus
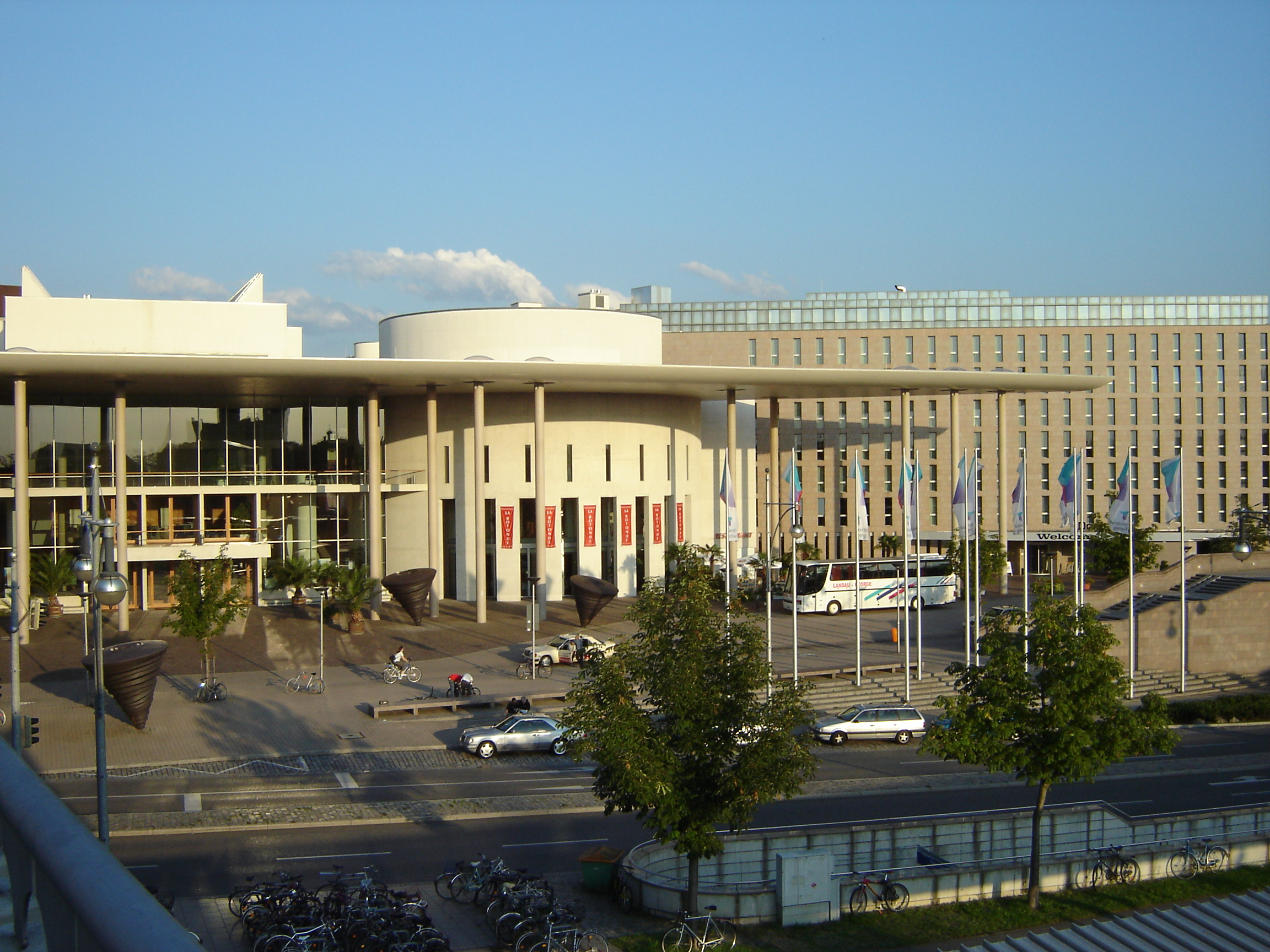
- Interactive map of Freiburg Konzerthaus
- Address: Konrad-Adenauer-Platz 1 Freiburg im Breisgau; Germany
- Coordinates: 47.9959°N 7.8421°E
- Operator: Freiburg Wirtschaft Touristik und Messe GmbH & Co. KG
- Type: Concert hall

Construction
- Built: 1992–1996
- Opened: 28 June 1996
- Years active: 1996–present
- Architect: Dietrich Bangert

Website
- konzerthaus.freiburg.de

The Freiburg Konzerthaus is a concert hall in Freiburg im Breisgau, Germany, that was opened to the public in 1996. Based on plans by architect Dietrich Bangert, the building is used for concerts and performances, as well as conventions and meetings. Until 2016, it served as the headquarters of the Southwest German Radio Symphony Orchestra. With its multiuse great hall, it serves as a venue for a range of diverse events.

== Location and surrounding area ==
The concert hall is located on Bismarckallee between Bertoldsstraße and Sedanstraße on the western side of Freiburg's old city. The back of the building borders the city block of 'Stadttheater.

== Architecture ==
=== Entrance area and foyer ===
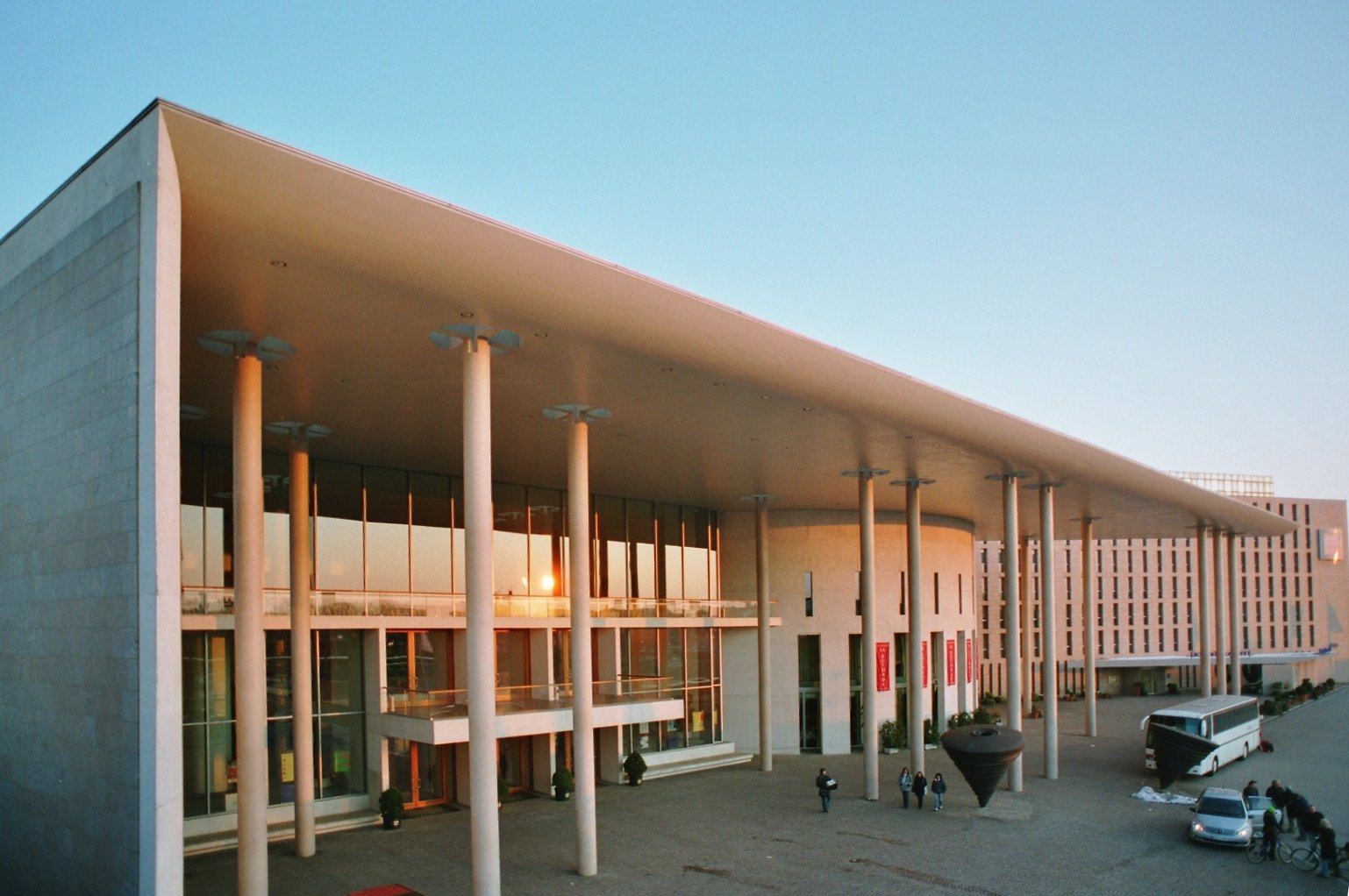
West-facing facade

While the northern facade looks rather closed because of its pink-gray granite colonnade and its adherence to the consistently large height of the buildings on Bertoldstraße, the western side offers a wide glass front and includes the main entrance. The northern facade also features a sharp-cornered, grey concrete loggia at a height of approximately 20 m. The loggia is carried by several columns and is supposed to be an outdoor representation of the inner spatial structure.

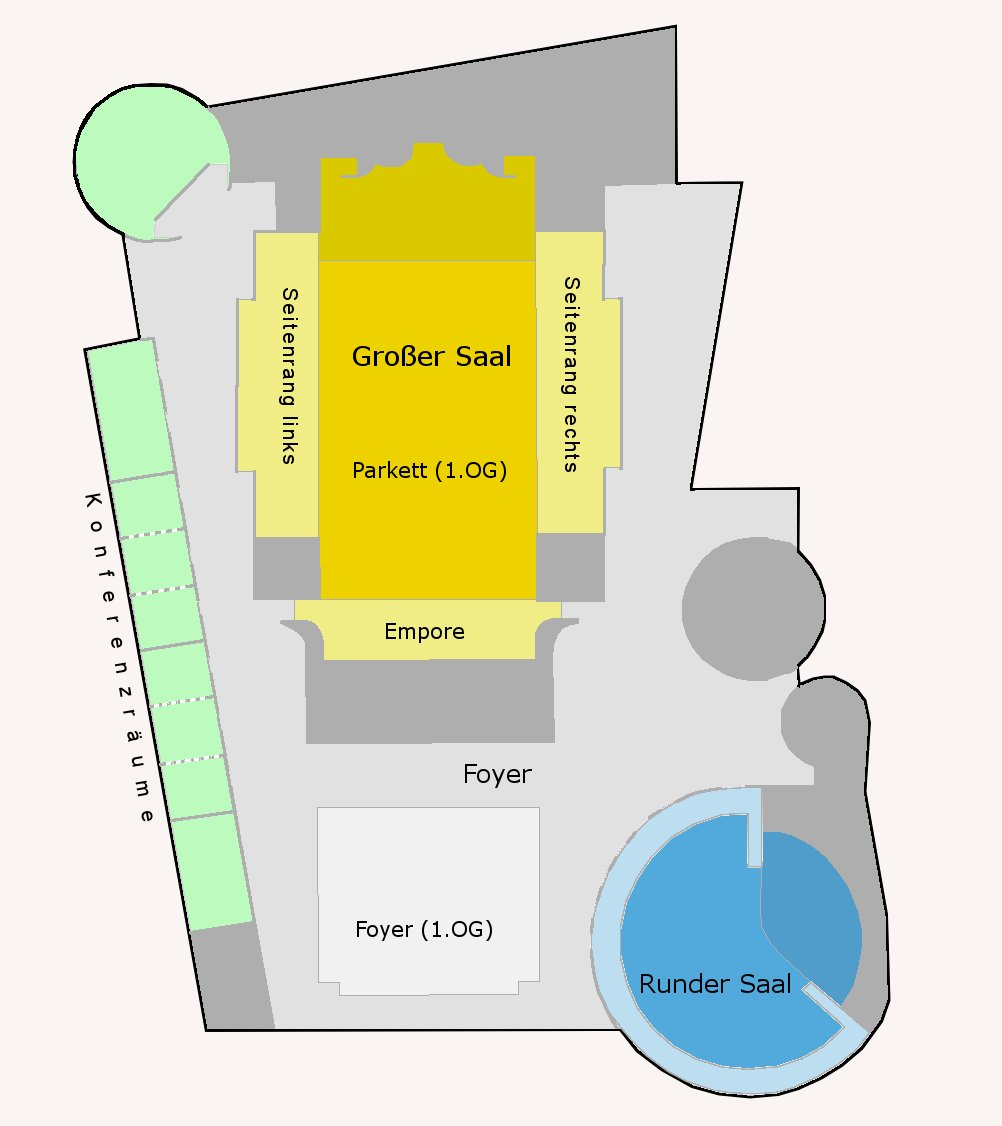
Floorplan of the concert hall (in German)

=== Rolf-Böhme-Saal ===
This rectangular concert hall is the heart of the Konzerthaus and built like a nave. It is 47 m long, 19 m wide, and has an average height of 19 m. The hall was named after Freiburg's former mayor Rolf Böhme, in whose term the Konzerthaus was built. The room can hold up to 1,744 people, which makes it the second biggest concert hall in Baden-Württemberg after the Festspielhaus in Baden-Baden.

=== Conference rooms and administration ===
Starting with the so-called "small drum", there are a total of nine conference rooms located on the second floor along Bertoldstraße. Of the eight rectangular rooms, six can be adjusted individually and can therefore be fitted for various occasions. All of these rooms are equipped with modern communication technology, as are the offices on the floor above.

Performers' dressing rooms can be found on the ground floor and there is a staff room in the mezzanine behind the big hall. Rooms for production, sound engineering, interpreters and administration are all in the attic. Likewise, there is storage space for instruments in the basement. All of these rooms are accessible via staircases and elevators that are not connected to the public space. Event organizers can enter the inner courtyard via Sedanstraße and access the stage on ground level through the back wall of the main hall.

=== Halls ===
Great Hall(Rolf-Böhme Saal) (1000 m^{2})		1776 (1774) people
Stalls	19.00 x 47.00 m	1106 people
2 galleries at the side	6.00 x 27 m	each 185 people
Row in the back	19.00 x 12.00 m	300 people
Round Hall (300m^{2})		436 (350) people
Hall	Ø 27 m	372 people
Gallery	-	64 people
Seminar rooms		240 (238) people
K2 to K4 and K5 to K7 can be used as one or two halls together,
K1 and K8 (62 m^{2})	12.00 x 5.00 m	(56) people
K2 to K7 (each 28 m^{2})	5.60 x 5.00 m	(each 28) people

== Building history ==
=== Prehistory (until 1983) ===
During the bombing on the evening of 27 November 1944, Freiburg lost its largest public assembly room at the time, a public hall near the municipal garden, the Stadtgarten. The previous building was completed in 1854 by local architect Friedrich Eisenlohr and provided enough room for up to 5,000 people. Even the city hall, which was built in 1954, was no sufficient compensation as its one-room concept and remote location at the eastern edge of the city centre proved inadequate for many events. Due to numerous areas of new housing and the incorporation of surrounding villages into the urban area of Freiburg, up until the mid-1970s. the centre of town had been moving west into the Upper Rhine Plain.

At the end of the 1970s, a building project to bridge the railway and thus connect the Stühlinger district with the other districts had been discussed, adapting plans by architect Manfred Saß. However, these plans, the so-called Bahnhofsplatte, never got beyond the status of a pilot project, as there were enormous building costs of approximately 86 million Deutsche Mark (roughly 44 million EUR) and the Deutsche Bundesbahn did not intend to finance large-scale projects due to the increasing competition presented by air travel. Further plans, already rejected by that time, intended a new building behind the municipal theatre or an extension of the Karlsbau.

=== Planning phase (until 1992) ===
==== "Culture and conference centre" feasibility study ====
In 1982, changes of government on all political levels led to a short-term interruption of the efforts to erect a big public building. Two years later, minister-president Lothar Späth guaranteed mayor Rolf Böhme government subsidies. In March 1984, the "culture and conference centre" feasibility study was conducted and approved by the local council. Following the previously suggested idea of having a Bahnhofsplatte (station plate), that is, a roofing extending over the rails, this study used a city-owned plot in the immediate vicinity of the station. As the building fit in the existing architecture of the city instead of towering above it and as the construction costs came to an estimated 44 million dollars, the study was considerably more realistic and adequate to the scarce public financial resources than the failed plans for the Bahnhofsplatte project.

On 12 November 1985, the local council set the costs at 70.5 million DM (roughly 36 million EUR). These costs were intended to be financed by a national funding of 30 Million DM (roughly 15.3 million EUR) and a reasonable equity of the local building society. The calculation also included inflation up to 76 million DM (roughly 38.9 million EUR) until the planned opening date of 1991. An architectural design competition with relatively strict rules was organized in order to realize the project and avoid proposals with high-cost risk.

==== Revision and planning phase ====
After a referendum, the planning phase was being heavily scrutinized by the public, and pressure was high to keep costs low. A final draft, released in 1991, reduced building space and gave the two lower floors to the hotel. Construction finally began in 1992.

In May 1992, excavation for the underground parking lot underneath the concert hall began. On 28 June 1996, the concert hall was opened ceremoniously and handed over to the operator, the Freiburg Management and Marketing Association.

Summary of the Building Cost
according to the publication date of the calculation and with regard to the general increase of the building cost
1987	90 M DM (roughly 46 M EUR)	-	-	-
1991	107 M DM (roughly 55 M EUR)	131 M DM (67 M EUR)	-	-
1996	115 M DM (roughly 59 M EUR)	168 M DM (roughly 86 M EUR)	143 M DM (roughly 73 M EUR)	-
1998	116 M DM (roughly 59 M EUR)	170 M DM (87 M EUR)	144 M DM (roughly 74 M EUR)	148 M DM (roughly 76 M EUR)

Apart from the political dispute, the acoustic quality of the big hall was predominantly criticized. Not only the members of the Southwest German Radio Symphony Orchestra, who are frequent tenants, with 150 rehearsals per year, but also the Berlin Philharmonic, during their first guest appearance, complained about poor conditions. They mentioned that the musicians could not hear each other very well, because the sound escaped into the 14-metre-high (46 ft) space above the stage. Even when the hall was empty, the acoustics were still hard to control. These kinds of problems are not uncommon in big concert halls shortly after their opening. For that reason, in 2001, after a testing phase of two years, thirty circular acoustic canvases, which can be adjusted in height, were installed at the ceiling above the stage area. Together with twelve mobile folding screens, they increased the investment by 800,000 DM (roughly 409,000 EUR) for the Freiburg Management and Marketing association.

== Bibliography ==
- Freiburger Stadtbau GmbH, ed. Konzerthaus Freiburg. Freiburg: Bangert, 1996. ISBN 9783925560897.
- Josef Diel. Ein Dach für alle. Von der alten Festhalle zum neuen Konzerthaus. Freiburg: Promo, 1996. ISBN 3923288204.
